= Outline of South Sudan =

Overview of and topical guide to South Sudan

Location of South Sudan

The following outline is provided as an overview of and topical guide to South Sudan:

South Sudan is a landlocked country in east-central Africa that is part of the United Nations subregion of Eastern Africa. It was previously known as Southern Sudan. It is located south of Sudan, and includes the vast swamp region of the Sudd, formed by the White Nile and known locally as the Bahr al Jabal. South Sudan became an independent state on 9 July 2011, following a referendum that passed with 98.83% of the vote. It is a United Nations member state, a member state of the African Union, and a member state of the Intergovernmental Authority on Development. In July 2012, South Sudan signed the Geneva Conventions. Its current capital is Juba, which is also its largest city. The capital city is planned to be changed to the more centrally located Ramciel in the future.

Flag of South Sudan

Coat of arms of South Sudan

== General reference ==
- Pronunciation: /suːˈdæn/ or /suːˈdɑːn/
- Common English country name(s): South Sudan
- Official English country name(s): Republic of South Sudan
- Nickname(s):
- Common endonym(s):
- Official endonym(s):
- Adjectival(s): South Sudanese
- Demonym(s): South Sudanese
- International rankings of South Sudan

== Geography of South Sudan ==
Geography of South Sudan

- South Sudan is: a country
- Atlas of South Sudan

=== Location ===
- South Sudan is situated within the following regions:
- Time zone(s):

=== Environment of South Sudan ===
Environment of South Sudan

- Climate of South Sudan
- Ecology of South Sudan
  - Ecoregions in South Sudan
- Wildlife of South Sudan
  - Fauna of South Sudan
    - Birds of South Sudan
    - Mammals of South Sudan
    - Insects of South Sudan
      - List of moths of Sudan and South Sudan

==== Natural geographic features of South Sudan ====
Landforms of South Sudan

- Rivers of South Sudan
- World Heritage Sites in South Sudan

=== Regions of South Sudan ===
Regions of South Sudan

- Bahr el Ghazal
- Equatoria
- Greater Upper Nile

==== Administrative divisions of South Sudan ====
Administrative divisions of South Sudan

- Regions of South Sudan
  - States of South Sudan

===== States of South Sudan =====
States of South Sudan South Sudan is divided into 32 states:

1. Imatong State
2. Kapoeta State
3. Maridi State
4. Amadi State
5. Gbudwe State
6. Tambura State
7. Jubek State
8. Terekeka State
9. Yei River State
10. Wau State
11. Aweil State
12. Lol State
13. Aweil East State
14. Twic State
15. Gogrial State
16. Tonj State
17. Eastern Lakes State
18. Western Lakes State
19. Gok State
20. Northern Liech State
21. Southern Liech State
22. Ruweng State
23. Jonglei State
24. Western Nile State
25. Northern Upper Nile State
26. Central Upper Nile State
27. Fangak State
28. Bieh State
29. Akobo State
30. Maiwut State
31. Latjor State
32. Boma State

===== Counties of South Sudan =====
- Counties of South Sudan – the ten states of the East African country of South Sudan are divided into 86 counties.

===== Municipalities of South Sudan =====
Municipalities of South Sudan

- Capital of South Sudan: Capital of South Sudan
- Cities of South Sudan

=== Demography of South Sudan ===
Demographics of South Sudan

== Government and politics of South Sudan ==
Politics of South Sudan

- Form of government: Federal presidential democratic republic
- Capital of South Sudan: Capital of South Sudan
- Elections in South Sudan
  - (specific elections)
- Political parties in South Sudan

=== Branches of the government of South Sudan ===
Government of South Sudan

==== Executive branch of the government of South Sudan ====
- Head of state: President of South Sudan, Salva Kiir
  - List of presidents of South Sudan
  - List of vice-presidents of South Sudan
- Head of government: President of South Sudan, Salva Kiir
- Cabinet of South Sudan
  - List of Finance Ministers of South Sudan
- Ministries of South Sudan
  - Ministry of Agriculture and Forestry (South Sudan)
  - Ministry of Animal Resources and Fisheries (South Sudan)
  - Ministry of Cabinet Affairs (South Sudan)
  - Ministry of Commerce, Industry and Investment (South Sudan)
  - Ministry of Culture, Youth and Sports (South Sudan)
  - Ministry of Defence and Veterans Affairs (South Sudan)
  - Ministry of Education, Science and Technology (South Sudan)
  - Ministry of Electricity and Dams (South Sudan)
  - Ministry of Environment (South Sudan)
  - Ministry of Finance and Economic Planning (South Sudan)
  - Ministry of Foreign Affairs and International Cooperation (South Sudan)
  - Ministry of Gender, Social Welfare and Religious Affairs (South Sudan)
  - Ministry of Health (South Sudan)
  - Ministry of Higher Education, Science and Technology (South Sudan)
  - Ministry of Housing, Physical Planning and Environment (South Sudan)
  - Ministry of Humanitarian Affairs and Disaster Management (South Sudan)
  - Ministry of Information and Broadcasting (South Sudan)
  - Ministry of Internal Affairs (South Sudan)
  - Ministry of Irrigation and Water Resources (South Sudan)
  - Ministry of Justice (South Sudan)
  - Ministry of Labour, Public Service and Human Resource Development (South Sudan)
  - Ministry of National Security (South Sudan)
  - Ministry of Parliamentary Affairs (South Sudan)
  - Ministry of Peace and CPA Implementation (South Sudan)
  - Ministry of Petroleum and Mining (South Sudan)
  - Ministry of Roads and Bridges (South Sudan)
  - Ministry of Telecommunication and Postal Services (South Sudan)
  - Ministry of Transport and Roads (South Sudan)
  - Ministry of Wildlife Conservation and Tourism (South Sudan)

==== Legislative branch of the government of South Sudan ====
- National Legislature of South Sudan (bicameral)
  - Upper house: National Legislative Assembly
  - Lower house: Council of States

==== Judicial branch of the government of South Sudan ====
Judiciary of South Sudan

- Supreme Court of South Sudan

=== Foreign relations of South Sudan ===
Foreign relations of South Sudan

- Diplomatic missions in South Sudan
  - List of Ambassadors of the United Kingdom to South Sudan
  - People's Republic of China Ambassador to South Sudan
  - United Nations Mission in South Sudan
  - United States Ambassador to South Sudan
- Diplomatic missions of South Sudan
- Egypt–South Sudan relations
- India–South Sudan relations
- Israel–South Sudan relations
- South Sudan–Sudan relations
- South Sudan–Uganda relations
- South Sudan–United States relations
- Philippines–South Sudan relations

==== International organization membership ====
International organization membership of South Sudan South Sudan is a member of:

- African Union (AU)
- Food and Agriculture Organization (FAO)
- Group of 77 (G77)
- International Bank for Reconstruction and Development (IBRD)
- International Civil Aviation Organization (ICAO)
- International Red Cross and Red Crescent Movement (ICRM)
- International Development Association (IDA)
- International Fund for Agricultural Development (IFAD)
- International Finance Corporation (IFC)
- International Federation of Red Cross and Red Crescent Societies (IFRCS)
- International Labour Organization (ILO)
- International Monetary Fund (IMF)
- International Criminal Police Organization (Interpol)
- International Organization for Migration (IOM)
- Inter-Parliamentary Union (IPU)
- Multilateral Investment Guarantee Agency (MIGA)
- United Nations (UN)
- United Nations Conference on Trade and Development (UNCTAD)
- United Nations Educational, Scientific, and Cultural Organization (UNESCO)
- Universal Postal Union (UPU)
- World Customs Organization (WCO)
- World Health Organization (WHO)
- World Meteorological Organization (WMO)

=== Law and order in South Sudan ===
Law of South Sudan

- Constitution of South Sudan
- Human rights in South Sudan
  - LGBT rights in South Sudan
- Law enforcement in South Sudan
  - South Sudan Police Service
- Visa policy of South Sudan

=== Military of South Sudan ===
Military of South Sudan

- Command
  - Commander-in-chief: President of South Sudan
    - Ministry of Defence and Veterans Affairs (South Sudan)
- Forces
  - Army of South Sudan
  - Navy of South Sudan: none

=== Local government in South Sudan ===
Local government in South Sudan

== History of South Sudan ==
History of South Sudan

=== History of South Sudan, by period ===
- Addis Ababa Agreement (1972)
- Anyanya
- First Sudanese Civil War
- Second Sudanese Civil War
- South Kordofan conflict
- Southern Sudan Autonomous Region (1972–1983)
- Comprehensive Peace Agreement (2005)
- Constitution of Southern Sudan (2005)
- Southern Sudan Autonomous Region (2005–2011)
- South Sudanese independence referendum, 2011
- Sudanese nomadic conflicts
  - South Sudan internal conflict (2011–present)
- 2012 South Sudan–Sudan border war

=== History of South Sudan, by subject ===
- Military history of South Sudan
  - South Sudan Defence Forces

== Culture of South Sudan ==
- Child marriage in South Sudan

Culture of South Sudan

- Languages of South Sudan
  - Bai language (South Sudan)
  - Baka language (South Sudan)
  - Beli language (South Sudan)
  - Lango language (South Sudan)
- Media in South Sudan
- National symbols of South Sudan
  - Coat of arms of South Sudan
  - Flag of South Sudan
  - National anthem of South Sudan
- People of South Sudan
  - Aja people (South Sudan)
  - Bai people (South Sudan)
  - Baka people (Congo and South Sudan)
  - Bongo people (South Sudan)
  - Lango people (South Sudan)
- Prostitution in South Sudan
- Public holidays in South Sudan
- Religion in South Sudan
  - Christianity in South Sudan
    - Roman Catholicism in South Sudan
      - List of Roman Catholic dioceses in South Sudan
  - Hinduism in South Sudan
  - Islam in South Sudan
- Scouting and Guiding in South Sudan
  - South Sudan Scout Association
- World Heritage Sites in South Sudan

=== Sports in South Sudan ===
Sports in South Sudan

- Basketball in South Sudan
  - South Sudan national basketball team
- Football in South Sudan
  - National football teams
    - South Sudan national football team
      - South Sudan national football team results
    - South Sudan women's national football team
  - South Sudan Football Association
  - South Sudan Football Championship
- South Sudan at the Olympics
- South Sudan National Cup

== Economy and infrastructure of South Sudan ==
Economy of South Sudan

- Economic rank (by nominal GDP):
- Banking in South Sudan
  - Central bank: Bank of South Sudan
  - Banks in South Sudan
- Communications in South Sudan
  - Media of South Sudan
  - Postage stamps and postal history of South Sudan
  - Telecommunications in South Sudan
    - Telephone numbers in South Sudan
- Companies of South Sudan
- Currency of South Sudan:
  - South Sudanese pound
- Energy in South Sudan
  - Power stations in South Sudan
- Health care in South Sudan
  - Hospitals in South Sudan
- Mining in South Sudan
- Tourism in South Sudan
- Transport in South Sudan
  - Air transport in South Sudan
    - Airlines of South Sudan
    - Airports in South Sudan
  - Rail transport in South Sudan
    - Railway stations in South Sudan
- Water supply and sanitation in South Sudan
  - Water supply in South Sudan

== Education in South Sudan ==
Education in South Sudan

- Universities in South Sudan
  - Catholic University of South Sudan
- Women's education in South Sudan

== People from South Sudan ==
- Angelo Dayu Agor, politician
- Francis Barsan, politician
- Muki Batali, politician
- Paul Lodu Bureng, politician
- John Malish Dujuk, politician
- Baptist Sabit Frances, politician
- Ngota Ifeny, politician
- Emmanuel Ija, politician
- Felix Ladu, politician
- Paterno Legge, politician
- Stephen Lemi Lokuron, politician
- Vincent Kujo Lubong, politician
- Thomas Lodu, politician
- Mary Karlino Madut, politician
- Clement Maring, politician
- Juliet Raphael Michael, politician
- Hellen Murshali, politician
- Ajonye Perpetua, politician
- Richard Remo, politician
- Adil Athanasio Surrur, politician
- Wol Dheil Thiep, politician
- John Lodu Tombe, politician
- Michael Tongun, politician
- Luka Anthony Ubur, politician
- Efisio Kon Uguak, politician
- Manasseh Lomole Waya, politician

== See also ==
- List of international rankings
- Outline of geography
- Bor Airport (South Sudan)
- Bor District (South Sudan)
- Daga River (South Sudan)
- List of South Sudanese state governors
- Pongo River (South Sudan)
- South Sudan Communist Party
- South Sudan Democratic Movement
- South Sudan Liberal Party
- South Sudan Liberation Movement
- South Sudan Oyee!
- South Sudan Relief and Rehabilitation Commission
- South Sudanese general election, 2010
- South Sudanese passport
- Talent Search South Sudan 2012
- The Citizen (South Sudan)
- Water For South Sudan
