= Clement Wani Konga =

South Sudanese politician (born c.1950)

Clement Wani Konga (Note: His surname is Wani Konga. Sources often, incorrectly, shorten this to Konga. A more normal short form would be Wani.) (born c. 1950) is a Mundari leader who fought in the Anyanya independence movement in the south of Sudan in 1969−72. He then joined the army of Sudan and rose to the rank of major general. In 2004 he made peace with the Sudan People's Liberation Movement (SPLM) and was appointed interim governor of Central Equatoria in South Sudan. In August 2015 he was dismissed from his post by President Salva Kiir. He continued to be active as chairperson of the Mundari Community.

== Early years ==
Clement Wani was born around 1950 in Terekeka, Equatoria, In the early 1960s he attended school in Okaru. In the mid 1960s he moved to Uganda, where he studied at the Mvra secondary school. In 1969 he joined the Anyanya movement. After training, he was commissioned as a lieutenant, and helped gain support for Anyanya in northern Equatoria. He fought in Equatoria and the Lakes District of Bahr el Ghazal.

== Military career ==
After the Addis Ababa Agreement (1972), Clement Wani became a captain in the army. He was later promoted to colonel in the Sudanese Armed Forces, and commander of the government garrison in Terekeka. In the mid and late 1980s he was involved in fighting with the Sudan People's Liberation Army (SPLA), during which he was wounded in 1986. He was made commissioner of Terekeka, and in the early 1990s formed a pro-government group there. After the Khartoum Peace Agreement of 1997 his armed group became part of the South Sudan Defence Forces, but retained its identity. He became a minister in the Coordinating Council of Southern States (CCSS) on 26 April 2003..

== Governor ==
Major General Clement Wani was made governor of Central Equatoria State in 2004, based in Juba. Due to his position in the army, there was at once a great improvement in security in Juba. In 2004 he quietly made contact with the leaders of the Sudan People's Liberation Movement (SPLM). In 18 July 2005 he was confirmed as caretaker governor of Central Equatoria by Dr. John Garang.

In September 2007 the leader of the Uganda traders in Juba was stabbed to death by a policeman, causing panic among the traders. In an interview Wani Konga noted that the penalty for murder was compensation or death, and the relatives of the deceased could choose which they wanted. He outlined measures he was taking to assert the rule of law. In September 2008 Wani Konga met Aloisio Emor Ojetuk, governor of Eastern Equatoria state in an attempt to resolve land disputes among the Acholi, Madi, Lulubo and Bari communities in the Kit area. The disputes originated from a colonial era boundary that put the Acholi and Madi into Eastern Equatoria and the Lulobo and Bari into Central Equatoria.

Wani was elected governor of Central Equatoria on the SPLM ticket in April 2010. He announced a plan in 2011 to build a power plant on the Aga Falls on the River Yei to supply power to Greater Yei which includes the counties of Morobo, Yei, Lainya, and Kajo-Keji. In 2012 Wani Konga went to Germany for medical treatment. There were rumors that he had died, but he returned to Juba in August 2012. In July 2019 Clement Wani was in Turkey for a medical examination related to his stroke the previous year.

In January 2015 Wani Konga spoke at a swearing-in ceremony for Central Equatoria cabinet ministers. He said that the ongoing civil war was between the Dinka tribe led by president Salva Kiir and the Nuer tribe led by rebel leader Riek Machar. The people of the three Equatorian states should stay neutral in this conflict. Salva Kiir said the statements were "irresponsible and misguided". In April 2015 Wani Konga's son, Captain Joseph Clement Wani Konga, defected to the SPLM/A-IO rebel group led by former vice president Riek Machar.

Wani Konga announced the launch of the new Equator Broadcasting Corporation in Juba on 6 July 2015. He was dismissed from his post in August 2015 by president Salva Kiir, and was replaced by Juma Ali Malou as a caretaker governor.

== Later career ==
On 12 July 2019 General Obuto Mamur Mete, minister of National Security, came to the J2 house assigned to Wani and his family and gave them 24 hours to vacate the property. The family told Mobutu that the house they meant to move to was still dilapidated and was occupied by Tiger forces.

In October 2020 former Governor Wani Konga was traveling to Terekeka with his sons Lawrence Al-Fatah Clement Konga and Clement Konga and his bodyguards when his vehicle broke down. They continued on foot to the nearest barracks. Later Al-Fatish and a companion were attacked and captured while walking on the road, and Al-Fatah was killed. In January 2022 a church leaders' peace conference was held in Juba, in which the Mundari community leaders denied involvement in the recent conflict at the cattle camps. Clement Wani, chairperson of the Mundari Community, delegated delivery of the response to Wani Buyu.

== Ministers ==
As of 2011 Wani Konga's cabinet consisted of:

Deputy Governor and Minister of Education	Manasseh Lomole Waya
Minister of Finance & Economic Development	Jacob Aligo
Minister of Animal Resources and Fisheries	Professor Paul Lodu Bureng
Minister of Physical Infrastructure	John Lodu Tombe
Minister of Agriculture and Forestry	Michael Roberto Kenyi
Minister of Culture, Information, Youth, Sports, Hotels and Tourism	Francis Barsan
Minister of Legal Affairs and Law Enforcement	Justice Ajonye Perpetua
Minister of Local Government	Paterno Legge
Minister of Labour and Public Service	Stephen Lemi Lokuron
Minister of Health	Dr Emmanuel Ija
Minister of Social Welfare	Ms. Hellen Murshali
Minister of Parliamentary Affairs	John Malish Dujuk
Minister of Co-Operatives & Rural Development	Michael Tongun
Minister of Environment	Juma Saeed Worju

== Sources ==
- Kuyok Abol Kuyok (2015), South Sudan: The Notable Firsts, AuthorHouse, ISBN 9781504943468
