= Scouting and Guiding in Sudan =

Scouting and Guiding associations in Sudan

The Scout and Guide movement in Sudan is served by

- The Sudan Girl Guides Association, member of the World Association of Girl Guides and Girl Scouts
- Sudan Scouts Association, member of the World Organization of the Scout Movement

== South Sudan ==
South Sudan became an independent country on July 9, 2011, at which time the organizations split.
