= Chan Reec Madut =

Judge from South Sudan

2nd Chief Justice of the South Sudan Supreme Court
- In office 15 August 2011 – 28 May 2025
- Preceded by: John Woul Makec
- Succeeded by: Benjamin Bak Deng

Chan Reec Madut is a South Sudanese jurist who served as chief justice of the South Sudan Supreme Court from 2011 to 2025. Appointed by President Salva Kiir, Madut's tenure as chief justice was noted for its corruption, nepotism, favouritism to the Sudan People's Liberation Movement, and partisanship.

== Career ==
During the 2011 South Sudanese independence referendum Madut was head of the southern bureau of Southern Sudan Referendum Commission. On 15 August 2011, President Salva Kiir dismissed John Woul Makec, chief justice of the South Sudan Supreme Court, and selected Madut, who was Makec's deputy, to replace him. Madut served until he and Deputy Chief Juistce John Gatwech Lul were removed by Kiir and replaced by Benjamin Bak Deng on 28 May 2025.

Madut's tenure as chief justice was noted for its corruption, nepotism, and favouritism to the Sudan People's Liberation Movement. In 2013, Madut appointed 78 legal assistants, including his daughter, without following the proper processes and were instead personally handpicked. Justice Clement Kuc, in his 2013 letter of resignation, accused Madut of "nepotism, favouritism, and lack of strategic direction". Madut appointed 15 judges to lower courts in 2015, despite the fact that only the president could appoint judges. In 2016, he praised Kiir for increasing the number of states from 10 to 28 despite the fact that the president lacks the constitutional powers to do so. In 2023, he endorsed Kiir's candidacy in the presidential election.

== Works cited ==
=== News ===
- "99% in South Sudan 'back secession'". Belfast Telegraph. 30 January 2011. Archived from the original on 27 June 2025.
- "Kiir sacks Chief Justice Chan Reec Madut after nearly 14 years in office". Sudans Post. 28 May 2025. Archived from the original on 27 June 2025.
- "Kiir sacks South Sudan's bank governor and chief justice". Sudan Tribune. 16 August 2011. Archived from the original on 27 June 2025.

=== Web ===
- Deng, Mark (12 May 2021). "South Sudan's chief justice is overstepping his bounds: why it matters for the rule of law". University of Queensland. Archived from the original on 27 June 2025.
