= Human rights in South Sudan =

Ethnic infighting and violations of human rights

Human rights in South Sudan are a contentious issue, owing at least in part to the country's violent history.

== Constitutional provisions ==
The Constitution of South Sudan describes the country as "a multi-ethnic, multi-cultural, multi-lingual, multi-religious and multi-racial entity where such diversities peacefully coexist". Part One of the Constitution also states that "South Sudan is founded on justice, equality, respect for human dignity and advancement of human rights and fundamental freedoms".

Part Two of the Constitution of South Sudan includes the Bill of Rights and provides a comprehensive description of rights and liberties protected under the Constitution. It states that "[all] rights and freedoms enshrined in international human rights treaties, covenants and instruments ratified or acceded to by the Republic of South Sudan will be an integral part of this Bill". The Bill covers a wide range of rights in political, civil, economic, social, and cultural spheres and places an emphasis on the rights of women, children, and the disabled. The Bill also protects freedoms, such as freedom from torture, freedom of assembly and association, freedom of worship, and freedom of expression and media, among many others.

== Civilian collective punishment ==
The national army, called the Sudan People's Liberation Army, is often accused of attacking civilians on suspicion of aiding rebels.

=== Shilluk disarmament campaign ===
In the government's Sudan People's Liberation Army (SPLA)'s anti-insurgency campaign to disarm rebellions among the Shilluk and Murle, they burned scores of villages, raped hundreds of women and girls and killed an untold number of civilians. Civilians alleging torture by the SPLA claim fingernails being torn out, burning plastic bags dripped on children to make their parents hand over weapons and villagers burned alive in their huts if rebels were suspected of spending the night there. The United Nations Human Rights Council reported many of these violations, and the frustrated director of one Juba-based international aid agency called them "human rights abuses off the Richter scale". Human Rights Watch alleges that both the SPLA and the rebel group led by Johnson Olony were responsible for atrocities.

=== Suppression of South Sudan Liberation Movement ===
The South Sudan Liberation Movement (SSLM) led by Peter Gadet rebelled against the SPLA led government. To put down the rebellion, it was alleged that the SPLA set fire to over 7,000 homes in Unity state in May 2011.

=== Operation Restore Peace ===
Beginning in March 2012, security forces executed a disarmament campaign called "Operation Restore Peace" among the Murle people in Jonglei state. Amnesty International researchers claim these security forces committed widespread torture against civilians, including children as young as 18 months. A Human Rights Watch report describes how the SPLA allegedly burned and looted homes, destroyed schools, churches, and the compounds of aid agencies providing life-saving assistance. The disarmament exercise initiated ended with little success.

=== South Sudanese Civil War ===
In the 2017 South Sudan famine, the government is accused by the US and aid groups among others of using starvation as a tactic of collection punishment for populations that support rebels by intentionally blocking aid.

Amnesty International claimed the army suffocated to death in a shipping container more than 60 people accused of supporting the opposition.

== Ethnic violence ==
During the war for independence, more southerners died at each other's hands than were killed by northerners as a result of the infighting. In the Bor massacre in 1991, an estimated 2000 civilians were killed by SPLA-Nasir and armed Nuer civilians and another estimated 25,000 died from the resulting famine in the following years.

In 2010, prior to South Sudanese independence the following year, the CIA issued a warning that "over the next five years ... a new mass killing or genocide is most likely to occur in southern Sudan." The Nuer White Army of the Lou Nuer released a statement to "wipe out the entire Murle tribe on the face of the earth as the only solution to guarantee long-term security of Nuer's cattle." Activists, including Minority Rights Group International, warned of genocide in Jonglei.

The South Sudanese Civil War has killed up to 300,000 civilians, including notable atrocities such as the Nuer massacre and 2014 Bentiu massacre. There are ethnic undertones between the Dinka and Nuer in the fighting. The United Nations rights office has described the situation in the country as "one of the most horrendous human rights situations in the world." It accused the army and allied militias as allowing fighters to rape women as form of payment, as well as raid cattle in an agreement of "do what you can, take what you can." A 2015 United Nations report accused the army of gang raping and burning alive of girls and women. A 2015 African Union report accused both sides of rape, torture and forced cannibalism.

On 23 September 2020, the Amnesty International stated that serious human rights violations continued even after the formation of the Revitalized Transitional Government of National Unity. The UN reports indicated that fighting between ethnic groups surged dramatically and more organized forces started participating in the violence. The violence resulted in abductions of civilians, killings of hundreds of civilians, sexual violence and the displacement of thousands.

== Civil liberties and freedoms ==
=== Political freedom ===
After South Sudan gained its independence in 2011, Salva Kiir was elected president and revised the South Sudanese constitution to give great power to the executive. Kiir used his broad powers, which include the inability to be impeached and the authority to fire governors and dissolve parliament, to dismiss his entire cabinet and vice president Riek Machar in 2013. Beginning in 2014, Kiir and the ruling elites have ruled the country in an increasingly opaque manner. The public had little say in policymaking and was ignored in discussions of the creation of a new constitution and peace talks to end the civil war.

Abdel Rahman Sule, the leader of the key opposition group United Democratic Forum, has been under arrest since November 3, 2011 over allegations linking him to the formation of a new rebel group fighting against the government. The SPLA is generally intolerant of opposition, and although there are officially five opposition parties in South Sudan, none of them have the resources or experience necessary to gain true political power.

=== Press freedom ===
In 2015, Salva Kiir threatened to kill journalists who reported "against the country". Days later, in August 2015, journalist Peter Moi was killed in a targeted attack, being the seventh journalist killed during the year. South Sudanese journalists then held a 24-hour news blackout. As a result of the deterioration in the operating environment for journalists, many practice self-censorship or have left the country altogether.

=== Civil society ===
South Sudanese civil society groups called on Kenya to investigate the disappearance of South Sudanese activists in Nairobi. Many point to the presence of South Sudanese security in Kenya and the alleged complicity of some Kenyan authorities.

=== Justice system ===
The justice system of Sudan has insufficiently upheld equal rights for the South Sudanese people. According to Amnesty International, the government has failed to guarantee due process and fair trials, and it has also arbitrarily arrested and detained people without ensuring their right to legal counsel. The defection of many police officers, as well as other internal conflicts, has decreased the police and judiciary's ability to enforce the law, especially in areas like Jonglei, Unity, and Upper Nile.

== Social rights ==
=== Women's rights ===
Before independence, during the liberation period from 1956 to 2005, many women in South Sudan were denied access to quality education or were unable to complete their studies because war limited access to basic services. When educational opportunities were available, boys were often given priority.

After independence in 2011, South Sudan included women's rights in its Transitional Constitution. However, pre-existing practices such as forced and early marriage, domestic violence, rape, and sexual assault continued, while customary law, widely used in both rural and urban areas, often reinforced gender inequality. According to the United Nations, 33 percent of South Sudanese women were moderately or severely food insecure in 2011, and a 2012 study stated that many women in South Sudan lived "without basic forms of human security, health care or economic stability". The outbreak of civil war in 2013, widespread insecurity, corruption, and the absence of a permanent constitution further hindered implementation. By the end of 2016, women's rights remained weakly protected in practice.

South Sudan signed the Maputo Protocol in 2013 and ratified it in 2023, formally committing to an African Union treaty that guarantees women's rights, including political participation, equality, reproductive autonomy, and protection from female genital mutilation.

As of February 2024, women held about 32.4% of parliamentary seats in South Sudan.

==== Gender-based violence ====
Violence against women is extremely prevalent in South Sudan. Prolonged conflict in the region leads to greater gender-based violence, such as "disruption of community and family structures, presence of arms, weakened legal and security institutions, and heightened tensions related to displacement". The biggest threat of violence to women comes from within the home. In 2009, 41 percent of survey respondents reported that they had experienced gender-based violence in the past year, of which the most common forms were physical violence (47%), psychological violence (44%), economic violence (30%), and sexual violence (13%). In a 2011 Human Security Baseline Assessment, 59 percent of surveyed women had experienced gender-based violence at home, and 19 percent had experienced gender-based violence in their community. As at the year 2018, 26.7% of women who are aged between 15 and 49 years reported that they had been subject to physical and/or sexual violence by a partner who is currently or have formerly been intimate with in the last 12 months. In a 2013 study, Jennifer Scott et al. found "an overwhelming acceptance of violence against women, by both women and men," in many communities in South Sudan. The majority of survey respondents agreed that "there are times when a woman deserves to be beaten and that a woman should tolerate violence to keep her family together".

A UN survey found that 70% of women who were sheltering in IDP camps had been raped since the beginning of the conflict, mostly by police officers and soldiers. The SPLA were reported to have recruited militias and young men in Unity state to take back rebel held areas. They were given guns and their pay was what they could loot and women they could capture, who were raped.

In 2021, South Sudan health authority responded to estimate of 330 cases of gender based violence like rape, physical violence and other cases of gender based violence. The In charge of gender based violence center Samuel Legge, in Juba Teaching Hospital which is the main referral hospital in Capital Juba said, the main issue is delay in reporting gender based violence cases to the center.

=== Children's rights ===
==== Child labor ====
The government of South Sudan has made efforts to eliminate child labor and promote children's rights, but their attempts have been largely ineffective. Despite launching the Children, Not Soldiers campaign, a Ministry of Defense program that raised awareness about the issue of child soldiers in South Sudan, the government's Sudan People's Liberation Army (SPLA) continues to recruit child soldiers and station them in conflict-ridden areas or use them as bodyguards. The government deployed child soldiers on the front lines in opposition attacks from the Sudan People's Liberation Army – In Opposition (SPLA-IO). The SPLA-IO also recruits child soldiers to fight for them in areas like Bentiu and other parts of Unity state. Even though the minimum age for voluntary military recruitment is 18, as determined by the Child Act, many child soldiers are much younger.

According to the United States Department of Labor, despite the Constitution and Child Act's provisions of free primary education, parents usually end up having to pay the salaries of their children's teachers, which is often a prohibitive cost for families. The cost of uniforms, high levels of food insecurity, high costs of living, and lack of access to schools due to poor infrastructure all contribute to the low levels of primary education completion in South Sudan. Only 32 percent of children ages 5 to 14 attend school, and the primary education completion rate is 37 percent. 46 percent of children ages 10 to 14 are working, and 11 percent combine work and school.

Under current laws, children are only required to attend school until age 13. However, children are not legally allowed to work until they are 14, which leaves them the most vulnerable to child labor violations during the ages of 13 and 14.

Law agencies in South Sudan have taken steps to combat child labor in creating government committees to establish referral mechanisms to report and address violations, but these agencies have been largely inactive.

==== Child marriage ====
Nearly half of girls ages 15 to 19 are married, with some girls forced into marriage as early as age 12. Because of child marriage, only 37 percent of girls attend primary school, while 51 percent of boys do. Despite a 2008 law that protects girls from early marriage, child marriage is still extremely prevalent. This is due to widespread cultural views that marrying early is in the best interest of girls, since it allows families to access resources that are traditionally paid in the dowry.

=== Ethnic minority rights ===
South Sudan is an ethnically diverse country, with over 60 different major ethnic groups. The largest ethnic groups are the Dinka, Nuer, and Shilluk. Because of its diversity, according to scholar Jok Madut Jok, "insecurity that adopts ethnic fault lines is likely to lead to erosion of the kind of political unity that had been sustained by liberation wars and opposition to north Sudan." Ethnic violence has engulfed much of South Sudan and has undermined attempts at creating ethnic cohesion. It also reinforces poverty and strains ethnic relations, "leading to ethnic-based competition over limited resources and political offices." Ethnic rivalries make development almost impossible due to the insecurity and violence it promotes.

The domestic law of South Sudan forbids hate speech and punishes incitement to violence with 1 to 20 years of imprisonment. However, hate speech against ethnic minorities in South Sudan has continued to be practiced. A UNMISS report states that "[widespread] stereotyping, the creation and use of 'enemy' images, [and] hate speech amounting to incitement to violence have also exacerbated the conflicts." These messages include proposals of wiping out communities and removing ethnic groups from their lands.

=== Religious minority rights ===
The Constitution of South Sudan declares the separation of religion and state and prohibits religious discrimination. It states that "[all] religions shall be treated equally, and religion of religious beliefs shall not be used for divisive purposes. The Constitution of Southern Sudan provides for freedom of religion, and other laws and policies of the GoSS contribute to the generally free practice of religion. The INC and the Constitution of Southern Sudan both deny recognition to any political party which discriminates on the basis of religion. There are no legal remedies to address constitutional violations of religious freedom by government or private individuals.

In 2022, the majority of the South Sudanese population is Christian (60.5%), with a larger number of followers of animist religions (33%); there is also a sizeable Muslim minority (6%).

Leaders from all major religious groups in South Sudan attend ceremonial public events. Religious education is generally included in public secondary school and university curricula; Christian and Muslim private religious schools can set their own religious curriculum without government input on their content.

==== Freedom of religion ====
In 2023, the country was scored 1 out of 4 for religious freedom; this was mainly due to the threat of ethnic violence.

== International law framework ==
The Republic of South Sudan voluntary pledged in October 2013 for candidature to the Human Rights Council. It stated that its interest in joining the Human Rights Council stemmed from "its desire both to contribute to the promotion of human rights, based on the principles that inspired its liberation struggle, and to take advantage of its membership to enhance its knowledge of international human rights and build its capacity to promote and protect those rights".

In 2013, South Sudan acceded to several treaties and submitted them to the Legislative Assembly for adoption. These treaties include:

- International Covenant on Civil and Political Rights, 1966
- International Covenant on Economic, Social, and Cultural Rights, 1966
- African Charter on Human and Peoples' Rights, 1981
- Convention Governing the Specific Aspects of Refugee Problems in Africa, 1969
- Convention on the Elimination of All Forms of Discrimination against Women and its Optional Protocol, 1979
- International Convention on the Elimination of All Forms of Racial Discrimination, 1965
- Convention on the Rights of the Child, 1989
- Convention against Torture and Other Cruel Inhuman or Degrading Treatment of Punishment, 1984
- Convention on the Prohibition of the Use, Stockpiling, Production and Transfer of Anti-Personnel Mines and on Their Destruction, 1997

In 2015, South Sudan ratified five international human rights treaties. These treaties are the Convention on the Elimination of All Forms of Discrimination against Women and its Optional Protocol, Convention against Torture and Other Cruel, Inhuman of Degrading Treatment of Punishment and its Optional Protocol, and Convention on the Rights of the Child.

== See also ==
- LGBT rights in South Sudan
