= Batali =

Batali may refer to:

- Batali River, a river of Dominica
- Batali Hill, a hill in Chittagong, Bangladesh

== People with the surname ==
- Mario Batali (born 1960), American chef, writer, restaurateur and media personality
- Muki Batali, South Sudanese politician

== See also ==
- Batalin
