= Christopher Sarafino Wani Swaka =

South Sudanese politician and Mayor of Juba City Council

Mayor of Juba City Council
- Incumbent
- Assumed office 17 October 2025
- Preceded by: Johnson Swaka Ngisak

Christopher Sarafino Wani Swaka is a South Sudanese businessman and politician. Since October 2025 he has been the Mayor of Juba City Council. He was appointed to the position by the Central Equatoria State Governor, Gen. Rabi Mujung Emmanuel, replacing Johnson Swaka Ngisak.

== Career ==
Swaka worked as a businessman before becoming Mayor of Juba City Council. He had previously served as Mayor of Juba under Governor Clement Wani Konga. During that earlier term, he introduced Juba's first traffic lights in 2014.

In October 2025, Central Equatoria State Governor Rabi Mujung Emmanuel appointed Swaka as Mayor of Juba City Council, replacing Johnson Swaka Ngisak. Following his appointment, Swaka said that his administration would introduce a 100-day plan to improve city services and deal with sanitation, waste management and infrastructure problems in Juba.
