= LGBTQ rights in South Sudan =

- South Sudan
- Legal status: Illegal since 1991
- Penalty: 10 years' imprisonment (not enforced)
- Gender identity: No
- Military: No
- Discrimination protections: None

Family rights
- Recognition of relationships: No recognition of same-sex unions
- Restrictions: Constitutional ban since 2011
- Adoption: No

Lesbian, gay, bisexual, transgender, and queer (LGBTQ) people in South Sudan face legal and societal challenges not experienced by non-LGBTQ residents. Male same-sex sexual activity is illegal and carries a penalty of up to 10 years' imprisonment. Transgender people and cross dressers are criminalised under Section 379 which states, "any male person who dresses or is attired in the fashion of a woman" may be punished by up to three months' imprisonment. Authorities do not actively enforce the law; no prosecutions are known to have occurred since South Sudan gained its independence in 2011.

According to the nation's Constitution, same-sex marriage is banned. LGBTQ persons are met with abuse and discrimination from agents of the government and face widespread stigmatisation among the broader population.

== History ==
South Sudan was formerly part of Sudan, and subject to its interpretation of Sharia law, under which homosexual activity was illegal, with punishments ranging from lashes to the death penalty. In 2008, the autonomous Government of Southern Sudan adopted its own penal code, which prohibits "carnal intercourse against the order of nature" and prescribes a sentence of ten years' imprisonment.

== Legal status and enforcement ==
The Penal Code (2008) criminalises same-sex sexual conduct as "unnatural offences". These are defined in Article 248 as "carnal intercourse against the order of nature"; a maximum ten-year prison sentence, a fine, or both, are prescribed. This preexisting legislation remained part of the country's criminal code once independence was fully established in 2011. The US State Department's annual human rights reports have noted that there were no reported instances of enforcement of this provision for the entirety of the country's existence as of 2022.

The law also criminalises cross dressing by men with a provision stating "any male person who dresses or is attired in the fashion of a woman" in public, with a punishment of up to three months' imprisonment if convicted.

Same-sex couples have no legal recognition. Same-sex marriage is constitutionally banned, since the country adopted its Constitution in 2011.

== Discrimination and harassment ==
The U.S. Department of State's 2022 Human Rights Report found that "most openly LGBTQI+ citizens" had fled from South Sudan "because of actively hostile government rhetoric and action", while their reports from 2018 to 2022 found "there were reports", or "some reports", of incidents of discrimination and abuse: "LGBTQI+ persons reported security forces routinely harassed and sometimes arrested, detained, tortured, and beat them". In comparison, the State Department's report for 2011, the first year of South Sudan's independent existence, found "widespread" societal discrimination against gay men and lesbians.

The country has no known LGBTQ-support organisations. The Non-Governmental Organisations Act (2016) regulates organisations such as NGOs. It contains a provision that these may not contravene the country's "sovereignty, ... its institutions and laws". As same-sex sexual activity remains illegal, civic organisations that support gender diversity or LGBTQ rights may not be permitted to operate in South Sudan. A community-based organisation supportive of LGBTQ rights, Access for All, was reportedly intimidated into closing its doors in 2017. It was raided by security forces; some staff were detained for several months, but released without charge, according to the organisation's executive director, who later left the country.

== Anti-discrimination protections ==
There is no anti-discrimination or hate crime legislation that protects LGBTQ persons from harassment or abuse on the basis of their sexual orientation or gender identity. As of 2020, harassment of employees based on sexual orientation or gender identity is prohibited for all oil and gas companies operating in South Sudan.

== Political and leader stances ==
In September 2017 the government minister for Labour, Public Service, and Human Resource Development, Gathoth Gatkuoth Hothnyang stated the government would order security forces to arrest LGBTQ persons and detain them until they procreate. There were no reports of such arrests by year's end. In July 2010, Salva Kiir, now President of South Sudan, told Radio Netherlands Worldwide that homosexuality is not in the "character" of Southern Sudanese people. "It is not even something that anybody can talk about here in southern Sudan in particular. It is not there and if anybody wants to import or to export it to Sudan, it will not get the support and it will always be condemned by everybody", he said. In 2006, Abraham Mayom Athiaan, a bishop in South Sudan, led a split from the Episcopal Church of Sudan for what he regarded as a failure by the church leadership to condemn homosexuality sufficiently strongly.

== Summary table ==
Same-sex sexual activity legal	No (Penalty: Imprisonment for up to 10 years, not enforced)
Equal age of consent	No
Anti-discrimination laws in employment only	No / Yes Gasoline employment only.
Anti-discrimination laws in the provision of goods and services	No
Anti-discrimination laws in all other areas (Incl. indirect discrimination, hate speech)	No
Same-sex marriages	No (Constitutional ban since 2011)
Recognition of same-sex couples	No
Step-child adoption by same-sex couples	No
Joint adoption by same-sex couples	No
Conversion therapy made illegal	No
Gays and lesbians allowed to serve openly in the military	No
Right to change legal gender	No Crossdressing is illegal.
Access to IVF for lesbians	No
Commercial surrogacy for gay male couples	No
MSMs allowed to donate blood	Yes Since 2014

== See also ==
- Human rights in South Sudan
- LGBTQ rights in Sudan
