= Water supply in South Sudan =

Water supply and sanitation in Southern Sudan
- Flag of South Sudan

Data
- Water coverage (broad definition): (improved water source) c. 50%
- Continuity of supply: not available
- Average urban water use (L/person/day): not available
- Average urban water and sanitation tariff (US$/m^{3}): not available
- Share of household metering: low
- Annual investment in WSS: unknown
- Share of self-financing by utilities: low to none
- Share of tax-financing: low to none
- Share of external financing: high

Institutions
- Decentralization to municipalities: No
- National water and sanitation company: South Sudan Urban Water Corporation (SSUWC)
- Water and sanitation regulator: None
- Responsibility for policy setting: Ministry of Water Resources and Irrigation
- Sector law: No

Water supply in Southern Sudan is faced with numerous challenges. Although the White Nile runs through the country, water is scarce during the dry season in areas that are not located on the river.

About half the population does not have access to an improved water source, defined as a protected well, standpipe or a handpump within 1 km. The few existing piped water supply systems are often not well maintained and the water they provide is often not safe to drink.

Displaced people returning home put a huge strain on infrastructure, and the government institutions in charge of the sector are weak. Substantial external funding from numerous government agencies and non-governmental organizations is available to improve water supply.

== Water resources ==
Rainfall in Southern Sudan is highly seasonal, with a rainy season between July and October. In the extreme South of the country there is also a second rainy season from March to May. Groundwater is an important source of water supply for people and livestock, especially during the dry season. In some areas groundwater is brackish, groundwater yields are low and the success rate for well drilling is low.

The main river is the White Nile, which enters the country from Uganda in the South and flows to Sudan in the North. The new country's capital, Juba, as well as other cities such as Bor and Malakal are located on the river.

Most rivers besides the Nile, such as the Bahr el Ghazal River, the Sobat River and their tributaries, disappear during the dry season. The White Nile and the Bahr el Ghazal River flow in the Sudd, a large seasonal swamp in the heart of the country.

== Access ==
It is reported by WASHWatch that the total number of people in South Sudan lacking access to an "Improved" Water Supply in 2015 was 5,015,000. It is estimated that 58.726% of the population of Southern Sudan has access to an improved water source, such as a hand pump, a protected well or – for a small minority - piped water supply. Even those with access to an improved water source often do not receive safe water. Also, they do not receive water throughout the year, because piped water supply is intermittent or wells run dry. Those without access to an improved water source fetch water from rivers, ponds or open wells. This is often done by children and women. Some also buy water from vendors who use donkeys, bicycles or trucks to get water to their customers.

Access to potable water has been reduced as a result of the ongoing conflict in South Sudan, due to mass internal displacement (1,893,109 people internally displaced as of January 2017 which has seen million people displaced from their homes. In addition, during the conflict, many boreholes have been deliberately destroyed in rural areas.

The challenges of accessing clean water in South Sudan are dramatized in the short novel A Long Walk to Water which tells the story of Salva Dut, founder of Water for South Sudan.

== Institutional responsibility and policies ==
Within the government of Southern Sudan, the Ministry of Water Resources and Irrigation is responsible for policy setting, mobilization of external financing and regulation of drinking water supply. The Ministry was created in 2006, one year after the government of Southern Sudan was formed in preparation for the country's independence. The Ministry presented a water policy in 2007 and expects to produce a more detailed “strategic framework” for the sector in 2011. Service provision in urban areas is the responsibility of the newly created South Sudan Urban Water Corporation (SSUWC).

== Financing (external support) ==
Investment financing depends almost entirely on external grants. Important external partners in the water sector are Germany, Japan, the United States and the World Bank. The latter administers a Multi-Donor Trust Fund (MDTF) created in 2006.

Germany, through its agencies GIZ and KfW, finances the construction of a water supply system in the city of Yei. Japan, through its agency JICA, finances the expansion of the existing system in the capital, Juba. It also provides technical assistance to the national water utility SSUWC. The United States, through its agency USAID, provide support for water supply in Wau and Malakal. The MDTF supports rural water supply.

Donors of the MDTF include the Netherlands, Norway, the United Kingdom, the European Commission, Sweden, Germany, Denmark, Finland, Italy, Iceland, Greece, Canada, Spain, Egypt and the World Bank. UNICEF provides capacity building and training. A Basic Services Fund also supports rural water supply. It is financed by DFID, the Netherlands, Sweden, Canada, Norway and the European Union.

Numerous non-governmental organizations support water supply in Southern Sudan, such as the Obakki Foundation from North America, Caritas, GOAL from Ireland, Concern Worldwide from Ireland, the International Rescue Committee, Medair, Oxfam and Save the Children UK, and the locally led Water is Basic. Many of these groups finance their work through donations, but also through official development aid, such as the Basic Services Fund.

== See also ==
- Food insecurity and famine in South Sudan
