= List of South Sudanese flags =

The following is a list of flags used in South Sudan.

== National flag ==
Flag	Date	Use	Description
	2023–present	Flag of South Sudan	A horizontal tricolour of black, red, and green, fimbriated with white stripes; with a lighter blue equilateral triangle based on the hoist side bearing a gold star.
	2023–present	Flag of South Sudan	Variant with a tilted star.
	2023–present	Flag of South Sudan (vertical)	

== Government flag ==
Flag	Date	Use	Description
	2023–present	Flag of the President of South Sudan	A horizontal tricolour of black, red, and green, fimbriated with white stripes; with a blue equilateral triangle based on the hoist side bearing a gold star, and the national coat of arms towards the fly.

== Military flags ==
Flag	Date	Use	Description
	2011–present	Flag of the South Sudan People's Defence Forces (Note: Known as the Sudan People's Liberation Army (1983–2018).)	A tricolour of black, red, and green with the emblem in the center.
	1983–2011	Flag of the South Sudan People's Defence Forces	A tricolour of black, red, and green with the emblem in the center.
	1991–present	Flag of the Nuer White Army	Four horizontal stripes of red, black, white, and green.

== Political party flags ==
Flag	Date	Use	Description
	1995–present	Flag of the Sudan People's Liberation Movement	
	1995–present	Flag of the Sudan People's Liberation Movement	
	1995	Flag of the Sudan People's Liberation Movement	Similar to the national flag.
	1983–1995	Flag of the Sudan People's Liberation Movement	A horizontal tricolour of black, red, and green, fimbriated with white stripes; with a light blue equilateral triangle based on the hoist side bearing a red star.

== Sub-national flags ==
Flag	Date	Use	Description
	?–present	Flag of Central Equatoria	
	?–present	Flag of Eastern Equatoria	
	?–present	Flag of Jonglei	
	?–present	Flag of the Lakes State	
	?–present	Flag of Northern Bahr el Ghazal	
	?–present	Flag of Unity State	
	?–present	Flag of Upper Nile	
	?–present	Flag of Warrap	
	?–present	Flag of Western Bahr el Ghazal	
	?–present	Flag of Western Equatoria	
	?–present	Flag of the Abyei Special Administrative Area	
	?–present	Flag of the Greater Pibor Administrative Area	
	?–present	Flag of the Ruweng Administrative Area	
	?–present	Flag of Juba	

== Historical flags ==
=== Ottoman Empire (Turkish Sudan) ===
Flag	Date	Use	Description
	1820–1844	Flag of the Ottoman Empire	A red field with a white crescent moon and eight-pointed star.
	1844–1899	Flag of the Ottoman Empire	A red field with a white crescent moon and five-pointed star.
	1820–1844	Flag of Ottoman Egypt	A red field with a white crescent moon and seven-pointed star.
	1844–1867	Flag of the self-declared Khedivate of Egypt introduced by Muhammad Ali	Red flag with a white crescent containing a five-pointed white star.
	1867–1881	Flag of the Khedivate of Egypt	Red flag with a white crescent and three five-pointed stars.
	1881–1899	Flag of the Khedivate of Egypt under British occupation	

=== Mahdist State ===
Flag	Date	Use	Description
	1881–1899	Flag used during the Mahdist Revolt and in Mahdist Sudan	A golden field with blue and red borders and blue Arabic script in the center.
	1881–1899	Black Standard used in Mahdist Sudan	A simple black field.

=== Belgian Empire ===
Flag	Date	Use	Description
	1894–1910	Flag of Belgium	A vertical tricolour of black, yellow, and red.
	1894–1910	Flag of the Congo Free State and the Belgian Congo	A yellow five-pointed flag on a blue background.
	1894–1910	Flag of the Lado Enclave	A blue field with a yellow saltire that extends to the corners of the flag and four yellow stars in each blue triangle.

=== Anglo-Egyptian Sudan ===
Flag	Date	Use	Description
	1899–1956	Flag of the United Kingdom, also known as the Union Jack	A superimposition of the flags of England and Scotland with the Saint Patrick's Saltire (representing Ireland).
	1899–1914	Flag of the Khedivate of Egypt under British occupation	
	1914–1923	Flag of the Sultanate of Egypt	Red flag with three white crescents, each containing a five-pointed white star.
	1923–1956	Flag of the Kingdom of Egypt and the co-official flag of the Arab Republic of Egypt	Green flag with a white crescent containing three five-pointed white stars.
	1952–1956	Flag of the 1952 Egyptian Revolution and the Republic of Egypt; The green monarchical flag remained the national flag of Egypt until 1958, even after the proclamation of the Republic.	Following the Revolution of 1952, the Free Officers retained the flag of the Kingdom, but also introduced the former Republic of Egypt flag colors of red, white, and black horizontal bands, with the emblem of the Revolution, the Eagle of Saladin, in the center band, with a green escutcheon with a white crescent and five stars.
	1899–1956	Flag of the British Governor General	A Union Jack defaced with the emblem of Sudan.
	1925–1956	Flag of the Sudan Defence Force	A horizontal triband of black, white, and black, with two crossed swords in the center.
	April 1955	Provisional flag of Sudan used during the Afro-Asian Conference	A white field with "SUDAN" written in red in the center.

=== Under Sudan ===
Flag	Date	Use	Description
	1956–1970	Flag of Independent Sudan	A horizontal tricolour of blue, yellow, and green.
	1956–1970	Flag of Independent Sudan	Similar, but a 2:3 ratio.
	1962–1970	Naval ensign of Sudan	A white field with the national flag in the canton.
	1956–1970	Flag of the Sudanese Customs Service	
	1970–2011	Flag of Sudan	A horizontal tricolour of red, white, and black; with a green triangle based at the hoist.
	1970–2011	Flag of Sudan	Similar, but a 2:3 ratio.
	1970–2011	Flag of Sudan (vertical)	

=== Under South Sudan ===
Flag	Date	Use	Description
	2011–2023	Flag of South Sudan	A horizontal tricolour of black, red, and green, fimbriated with white stripes; with a darker blue equilateral triangle based on the hoist side bearing a gold star.
	2011–2023	Flag of South Sudan	Variant with a tilted star.
	2011–2023	Flag of South Sudan (vertical)	

=== Independence movements ===
Flag	Date	Use	Description
	1967–1969	Flag of both the Azania Liberation Front (ALF) and the Southern Sudan Provisional Government (SSPG)	Four horizontal bands; red, white, black, white, red. The ratio of the bands' widths is around 2:1:6:1:2
	1969–1971	Flag used by the Nile Provisional Government (NPG), later the Nile Republic, led by Gordon Muortat Mayen	A horizontal tricolour of red, white, and green; with black star in the upper hoist corner and a shoebill inside a blue disc in the center.
	1969	The flag of the Nile State	A tricolor of red, black, and either green or blue (it is unclear which) with an emblem of a white shield and spears.

== See also ==
- Flag of South Sudan
- Coat of arms of South Sudan
