= Scouting and Guiding in South Sudan =

Scouting and Guiding associations in South Sudan

The Scout and Guide movement in South Sudan is served by

- South Sudan Girl Guides Association, member of the World Association of Girl Guides and Girl Scouts
- South Sudan Scout Association, member of the World Organization of the Scout Movement

South Sudan became an independent country on July 9, 2011, after which time the organizations split from the parent Sudanese organizations.
