= Adil Athanasio Surrur =

South Sudanese scientist and politician

- Born: January 1, 1960 (age 66); Raga, Republic of the Sudan
- Education: University of Gezira (MS, PhD)

Adil Athanasio Surrur (born 1 January 1960) is a South Sudanese scientist and politician.

Dr. Adil holds an MSc and a Ph.D. in Population Statistics from the University of Gezira.

== Career ==
In 2008, he served as the Chairperson in 5th Sudanese Population and Housing Census.

In 2010 he began serving as Minister of Education, Science & Technology in Western Bahr el Ghazal.

In 2015, during the formation of Lol State, he appealed to President Salva Kiir to grant Raga County statehood to avoid conflict between Raga farmers and Aweil pastoralists.

He has served as Chairperson of National Dialogue in Bahr el Ghazal; Secretary-General of the Western Bahr el Ghazal population committee; member of the Central Bank of South Sudan Board of Directors; Undersecretary of the Ministry of Education, Science and Technology; and Undersecretary of Ministry of Higher Education.
