= Ajonye Perpetua =

South Sudanese lawyer and politician

Ajonye Perpetua Paya
- Occupations: Lawyer, Politician, Women's rights activist
- Known for: Legal Affairs, Law Enforcement, Governance
- Office: Justice First Class; Minister for Legal Affairs and Law Enforcement, Central Equatoria; Deputy head of Legal Drafting, Presidential Office; Chairperson of Central Equatoria Land Commission

Ajonye Perpetua Paya (Note: Ajonye is her surname, and Perpetua Paya her given names. Sources have erratic spelling, also giving her surname as Ajonge and her given name as Perpetuar, Parpetua, Paperture, Papetus etc.) is a South Sudanese constitutional lawyer, judge and human rights activist. Until 2013 she was a first class justice in the South Sudan judiciary. She assisted in drafting the 2005 interim constitution of Sudan. She served in the cabinet of Central Equatoria State in 2011, then in the cabinet of President Salva Kiir, who dismissed her in May 2013. Since then she has held leadership positions in the South Sudan Law Society and has often spoken on civil rights issues including women's rights and gender-based violence. In 2023 she headed the Secretariat of the Judicial Reform Committee (JRC) of South Sudan.

== Official positions ==
Justice Ajonye is a constitutional lawyer. She was appointed a first class judge in the Sudan judiciary. The Comprehensive Peace Agreement was signed on 9 January 2005 at the end of the Second Sudanese Civil War. Ajonye was a member of the National Constitution Review Commission in 2005 and then of the Drafting Committee that prepared the interim Constitution of Sudan. This was adopted on 6 July 2005.

South Sudan gained formal independence from Sudan on 9 July 2011. In 2011, Ajonye was Minister of Legal Affairs and Law Enforcement of Central Equatoria State in the government of Clement Wani Konga. She was then appointed deputy head of the legal drafting team in the Presidential Office by a Presidential Decree dated 5 December 2011. President Salva Kiir referred to this as a cabinet position.

On 7 May 2013, Ajonye and deputy Foreign Minister Elias Nyamlell Wako were dismissed by President Salva Kiir, who had announced that he would no longer tolerate criticism by members of his cabinet. There was speculation that the dismissal was due to disagreement over the way she was handling corruption allegations concerning some of the President's senior office administrators. She may have also fallen out with the presidential advisor for legal affairs, Telar Ring Deng. (Note: In July 2013 Kiir dismissed his entire cabinet. He nominated Telar Ring Deng for Minister of Justice in the new cabinet, but in an unusual move parliament rejected this nomination due to concerns about Deng's integrity.)

Republican Decree No. 34/2013 of 7 May 2013 also dismissed Ajonye Perpetua Paya as a 1st Class Judge. The relevant legal processes for the judicial dismissal were bypassed. The Fondazione Oasis described the dismissal from the judiciary as a "clear breach of the separation of powers".

On 26 June 2013 Clement Wani Konga, Governor of Central Equatoria State, issued a decree appointing Ajonye chairperson of the state's new Land Commission, responsible for overseeing land policies in the State. Her deputy was Patrick Ladu Sekwat. Ajonye was still Chairperson of the Central Equatoria Land Commission in April 2015 when she participated in a discussion on Is Forgiveness A Possible Route Towards Reconciliation in South Sudan?.

In June 2016 Ajonye was Deputy Chairperson of the Law Society of South Sudan. She was described as acting head of the South Sudan Law Society in September 2018. In April 2021 she was still Deputy Chairperson of the South Sudan Law Society. In April 2022 Ajonye was Acting Secretary-General and Vice President of the South Sudan Law Society, and legal advisor to the South Sudan Women Peace Security Monitoring Group.

In January 2023 Ajonye was Head of Secretariat of the Judicial Reform Committee of South Sudan. The JRC had been launched by the Government of South Sudan on 28 July 2022 to review laws, and to advise on judicial reforms and restructuring of the judiciary. It was chaired by Lord Justice James Ogoola (Uganda) with deputy chair Lady Justice Joyce Aluoch (Kenya).

== Civil rights activity ==
In June 2016 Ajonye spoke at workshop on The Role of Women in Peace-building: Lessons from South Sudan co-hosted by SALO and DIRCO in Pretoria, South Africa. In June 2020, Ajonye expressed disappointment in the continued marginalization of women in regards to property inheritance in South Sudan. In an interview with Eye Radio in June 2020 Ajonye spoke about the rights of the elderly duringt the COVID-19 crisis.

In January 2022 Ajonye pressed the South Sudan government for action on gender-based violence. She stated "We need holistic training on gender-based violence among police trainees so that when they are passed out, each police officer has an idea of what constitutes gender-based violence." In March 2022 Ajonye said at least 5,500 cases of human trafficking had been reported in South Sudan in 2021, of which 824 were in Juba. Over 1,000 involved girls under 18 years old. The true number could be three times higher. She called for the government to be more active in preventing these crimes.
