= International rankings of South Sudan =

International rankings of South Sudan

== Demographics ==
- Population ranked 94

== Geography ==
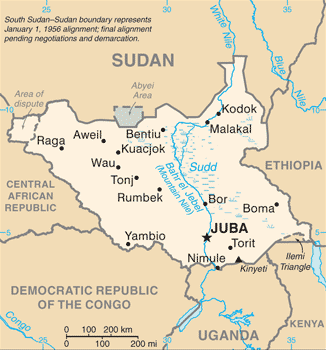
Map of South Sudan

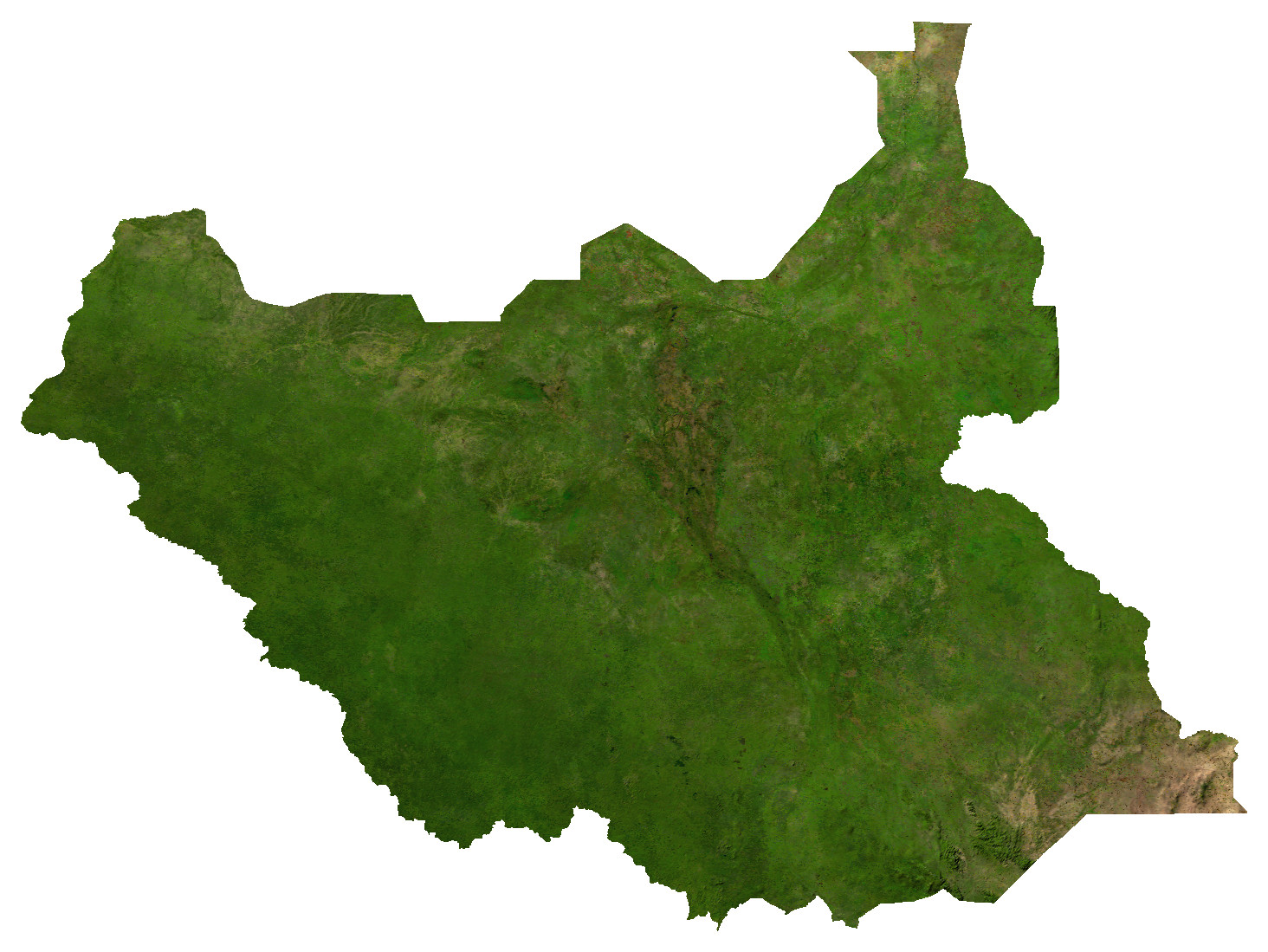
Satellite image of South Sudan

- Total area ranked 45

== Politics ==
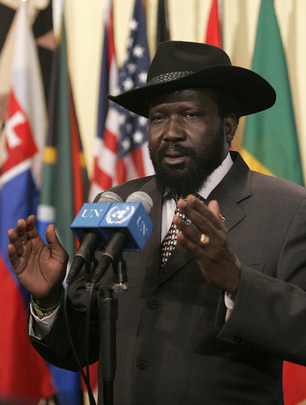
Salva Kiir is the first elected President of South Sudan

== Transportation ==
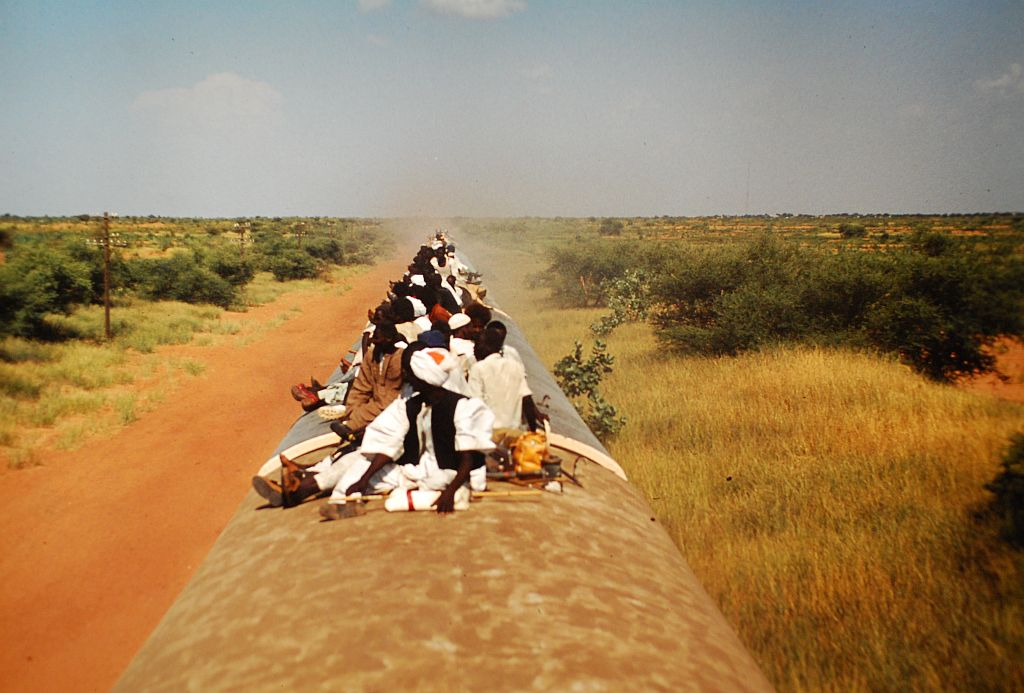
A train travelling towards Wau
