= Jacob Aligo =

South Sudanese politician

Jacob Aligo is a South Sudanese politician. He has served as Minister of Finance & Economic Development of Central Equatoria since 2005 under Governor Clement Wani Konga.
