= South Sudan Girl Guides Association =

National Guiding organization of South Sudan

South Sudan Girl Guides
- Country: South Sudan
- Founded: 2011
- Membership: 11,376
- Chief Commissioner: Mary Elias Ladu

The South Sudan Girl Guides Association is a member of the World Association of Girl Guides and Girl Scouts.

South Sudan became an independent country on July 9, 2011, at which time the South Sudan Girl Guides Association split from the Sudan Girl Guides Association.

Alice Waweru, Development Executive for English-speaking countries in the WAGGGS Africa Region visited South Sudan Girl Guides in Juba from May 30 to June 2, 2012. In 2013, the South Sudan Girl Guides Association was admitted as a member of the World Association Of Girl Guides And Girl Scouts and formally welcomed at the 2014 World Conference in Hong Kong.

With the recent history of war and violence in South Sudan, there is a particular emphasis on training in first aid, peace and reconciliation.

== See also ==
- South Sudan Scout Association
