= Batalin =

Batalin (Баталин in Russian) is a surname. Notable people with the surname include:

- Alexander Theodorowicz Batalin (1847–1896), Russian botanist
- Igor Anatolyevich Batalin (1945–2024), Russian physicist, see Batalin–Vilkovisky formalism
- Olga Batalina (born 1975), Russian politician

== See also ==
- Batali (disambiguation)
