= Elias Nyamlell Wako =

South Sudanese politician

Professor Elias Nyamlell Wako (or Wakoson (Note: His usual surname is Nyamlell, often followed by his father's name (Wako or Wakoson, Wakason, Wakson). Some sources treat Wako or Wakoson as his surname.)) is a South Sudanese academic and politician.

== Early years ==
Elias Nyamlell Wakoson was born in Wau Wau, Bahr Al Ghazal, in what is now South Sudan. He graduated from Rumbek senior secondary school in 1969, and went on to the University of Khartoum.

In 2004 Elias Nyamlell Wakoson was a professor of literature at Grayson College, Texas, USA. He distributed a document in South Sudan in which he said "The Bashir regime has reached a point where it has had enough of the SPLA, and it wants to bail out of the peace talks through a staged coup. Once they bail out, the successor of the present military government will come with its own agenda and demand that the whole game of negotiation with the SPLA start from zero."

== Government positions ==
Nyamlell joined the South Sudan government in November 2006. In July 2007 Nyamlell Wakoson was State Minister of International Cooperation of the Republic of the Sudan. He visited the United Nations Economic and Social Council in Geneva, where he spoke on Strengthening Efforts to Eradicate Poverty and Hunfer, including through the global partnership for development.

In February 2009 Elias Nyamlell was a member of the National Disarmament, Demobilization and Reintegration Coordinating Council. At a Disarmament, Demobilization and Reintegration (DDR) roundtable in Juba, he said US$88 million had been pledged by donor countries towards DDR. In March 2009 he said that 180,000 soldiers were expected to be demobilized eventually. He said the delay in the south was due to difficulty reintegrating the demobilized soldiers into society and the economy.

Nyamlell was Minister of Foreign Trade until 9 July 2011.

In February 2012, as deputy foreign minister, Professor Nyamlell Wako met the International Organization for Migration (IOM) Director-General, William Lacy Swing in Juba. Their discussion focussed on repatriating South Sudan nationals from the north. In August 2012 vice president Riek Machar and Elias Nyamlell met with a South Sudanese delegation from Canada and the USA. Machar urged the delegates to avoid divisions and put their home country first. Elias Nyamlell talked of reviving the diaspora desk in Juba as a way of coordinating members of the diaspora.

In February 2013 Nyamlell Wakoson suggested that the United Nations Office for Project Services (UNOPS) should agree to establish a UNOPS Country Office in Juba. The agreement was eventually signed on 10 November 2014 by Grace Datiro, Deputy Minister for Foreign Affairs, and Tegegnework Getto of the United Nations Development Programme.

In April 2013 Nyamlel said that the government of Salva Kiir was a "system that is rotten to the core". Nyamlell reportedly said in a meeting that the government was corrupt from top to bottom. In May 2013 Justice Ajonye Perpetua and deputy Foreign Minister Elias Nyamlell Wako were dismissed by President Salva Kiir, who had announced that he would no longer tolerate criticism by members of his cabinet.

== Later career ==
In January 2017 it was reported that Nyanmlel and Salah Salim Ismail, formerly Minister of Education of Western Bahr el Ghazal State, had defected to the Sudan People's Liberation Movement-in-Opposition (SPLM-IO) opposition group.

In January 2019 Elias Nyamlell led the SPLM-IO delegation to a meeting with national dialog committee members in Juba. He said the SPLM-IO would probably join the national dialog process, although some changes would be needed.

== Bibliography ==
- }Wakoson, Elias Nyamlel (1981), The Southern Sudan: the political leadership of the Anya-Nya movement, Abstract present in: Post-Independence Sudan: proceedings of a Seminar held in the Centre of African Studies. p. 86-113.
- Wakoson, Elias Myamlell (1984), The origin and development of the Anya-Nya movement 1955-1972, Abstract present in: Southern Sudan: regionalism & religion: selected essays / ed. by Mohamed Omer Beshir. - Khartoum: University of Khartoum, Graduate college. p. 127-204.
- Wakoson, Elias Nyamlell (1994), Political elite-military symbiotic relationship in Sudanese politics, its impact on South-North conflict, Toronto: African Studies Association
- Wakoson, Elias Nyamlell (1998), "Islamism and Militarism in Sudanese Politics: Its Impact on Nation-Building.", Northeast African Studies, vol. 5, no. 2, pp. 47–94, doi:10.1353/nas.1998.0014
