= A Long Walk to Water =

2010 novel by Linda Sue Park

First edition (publ. Clarion Books)

A Long Walk to Water (sometimes shortened to ALWTW) is a short novel written by Linda Sue Park and published in 2010. It blends the true story of Salva Dut (set in 1985) and the fictional story of Nya (set in 2008). Dut is a part of the Dinka tribe and a Sudanese Lost Boy, while Nya is a young village girl that is part of the Nuer tribe. Park used the book as a platform to support Dut's organization, Water for South Sudan.

== Main narratives ==
=== Salva ===
Salva, an 11-year-old boy from the Dinka tribe, finds himself becoming one of the Lost Boys after the Second Sudanese Civil War makes its way to his village and forces him to flee. At first, the group abandons him, perceiving him as a child that would slow them down. After an old Dinka woman gives him some peanuts, Salva finds some new travelers to move onward with and befriends another boy named Marial. After being reunited with his Uncle Jewiir, Salva and his group go to the Itang Refugee Camp in Ethiopia, avoiding rebels, lions, and other threats along the way. However, before reaching the camp, Marial is killed by a lion and Uncle Jewiir is murdered by some Nuer tribesmen. Eventually, after six years, the Itang Refugee Camp is closed when the Ethiopian government collapses in 1991. As a result, Salva is run out towards the Gilo River where hundreds are shot by soldiers or lost to the crocodiles. Thereafter, he becomes the leader of 1,500 Lost Boys and takes them to refugee camps in Kenya.

Afterwards, in 1996, he is taken to America adopted by the Moore family in Rochester, New York. Eventually, Salva travels back home and finds his biological father recovering from surgery for guinea worms due to years of consumption of contaminated and stagnant water. This pushed him to become the founder of a non-profit called Water For South Sudan (WFSS). Schools can fundraise money for Salva's organization to dig wells in South Sudan.

=== Nya ===
Nya is an 11-year-old girl from the Nuer tribe who has to walk eight hours a day, seven months out of the year, to fetch water from a pond in order to support her parents, younger brother, and younger sister, Akeer. She and her family live in a small village in Sudan during the year 2008.

Akeer gets sick and is told that the illness is due to water contamination. Even though Akeer is given treatment at a clinic, they are forewarned by a nurse that water should be boiled before being consumed. The advice proves difficult to implement due to a scarcity of both fuel and water.

Later, in 2009, a well is built in her village by two visitors after consulting Nya's uncle so that she and other residents would not have to walk as far and drink unsafe water. Although there are some complications during the process of drilling the well, the villagers and crew work together to eventually produce safe and clear water. The village transforms with the completion of the well; Nya is overjoyed when a school is built alongside the well, as the children do not spend their time collecting water.

At the end of the book, both Salva and Nya's stories crossover when Nya realizes Salva was the individual in charge of the drilling crew. She introduces herself to Salva Dut, because she was confused by the fact that Salva, a Dinka, would help her Nuer village. The Dinka and Nuer tribes have been at conflict for many years, and Park's short novel maintains those dynamics. Nya's story is fictional, though, and was based on travelers Park interviewed who saw water wells being drilled in villages similar to Nya's. She also examined their photographs and videos.

== Water for South Sudan ==
Water for South Sudan is a non-profit organization created by Salva Dut which drills wells for villages in South Sudan. It plays an important role in the story.

== Reception ==
A Long Walk to Water has received generally positive reviews from critics.

On Common Sense Media, Kate Pavao rated the book five stars. Pavao praised the book for showing Salva's courage and perseverance through his struggles.

Reviewing the book for The Newcastle Herald, Stacey Dombkins praised Park's execution of the dual narrative, stating that the book's "unsurprising but very satisfying ending" successfully showed how Salva's hope and determination brought positive changes to those residing in South Sudan.
