= Luka Anthony Ubur =

South Sudanese politician

Luka Anthony Ubur is a South Sudanese politician. He served as County Commissioner of Wau County, Western Bahr el Ghazal from 18 May 2010 to 9 May 2011 before being appointed advisor on youth & sports.
