= Wol Dheil Thiep =

South Sudanese politician

Wol Dheil Thiep is a South Sudanese politician. He has served as County Commissioner of Jur River County, Western Bahr el Ghazal since 18 May 2010, as well as the advisor of Security affairs to Governor Rizik Zackaria Hassan.
