= The Sudan Girl Guides Association =

National Guiding organization in Sudan

- logo
- Country: Sudan
- Founded: 1928
- Membership: 19,167
- Affiliation: World Association of Girl Guides and Girl Scouts

The Sudan Girl Guides Association (Arabic: الإتحاد السوداني للفتيات المرشدات) is the national Guiding organization in Sudan, headquartered in Khartoum. The association serves over 19,000 members (as of 2018). Founded in 1928, the girls-only organization became a full member of the World Association of Girl Guides and Girl Scouts in 1957.

South Sudan became an independent country on July 9, 2011, at which time the organization split into two organizations: the Sudan Girl Guides Association and the South Sudan Girl Guides Association.

== See also ==
- Sudan Scouts Association
