= Flag of South Sudan =

Republic of South Sudan
- Use: National flag
- Proportion: 1:2
- Adopted: 9 July 2005; 21 years ago 9 July 2011; 15 years ago (as national flag); 25 August 2023; 3 years ago (standardized)
- Design: A horizontal tricolour of black, red, and green, fimbriated with white stripes; with a sky-blue equilateral triangle based on the hoist side bearing a yellow star
- Tilted Star
- Use: National flag
- Proportion: 1:2
- Design: The official flag, particularly that used at the UN, features a straight (upright) yellow star within a light blue triangle.

The flag of South Sudan was adopted following the signing of the Comprehensive Peace Agreement that ended the Second Sudanese Civil War. A different version of the flag was previously used as the flag of the Sudan People's Liberation Movement. The flag of South Sudan predates the country, as the flag was adopted in 2005, while the country became independent in 2011.

== History ==
To address the discrepancies, on 25 August 2023, the Media Authority of South Sudan released an advisory to advertisement and printing companies identifying the correct version of the flag as having a light blue triangle and upright star. It is now illegal in South Sudan to distribute alternate reproductions of the flag which feature a dark blue triangle or tilted star.

== Description ==
The flag bears similarities with the flags of Sudan and Kenya. It shares the black, white, red, and green of the Sudanese flag (although the colours' symbolism are different), in addition to having a triangle along the hoist. The horizontal black, white, red, and green bands of the current South Sudanese flag share the same design as the Kenyan flag, and the Pan-African symbolism thereof. Another difference between the flags of Sudan and South Sudan is that there is a yellow star inside the blue triangle (like the flag of the Belgian Congo), representing the national unity of South Sudan.

Since the flag was adopted, there have been disagreements about whether the star should be tilted to the right slightly or upright, and whether the triangle should be dark blue or sky blue. The dark blue triangle and the fixed stars were used at John Garang's funeral in 2005. Variants of the flag with dark blue triangle, tilted stars, or both were commonly used until 2023, when the government declared the sky blue triangle and upright star as the only accepted version.

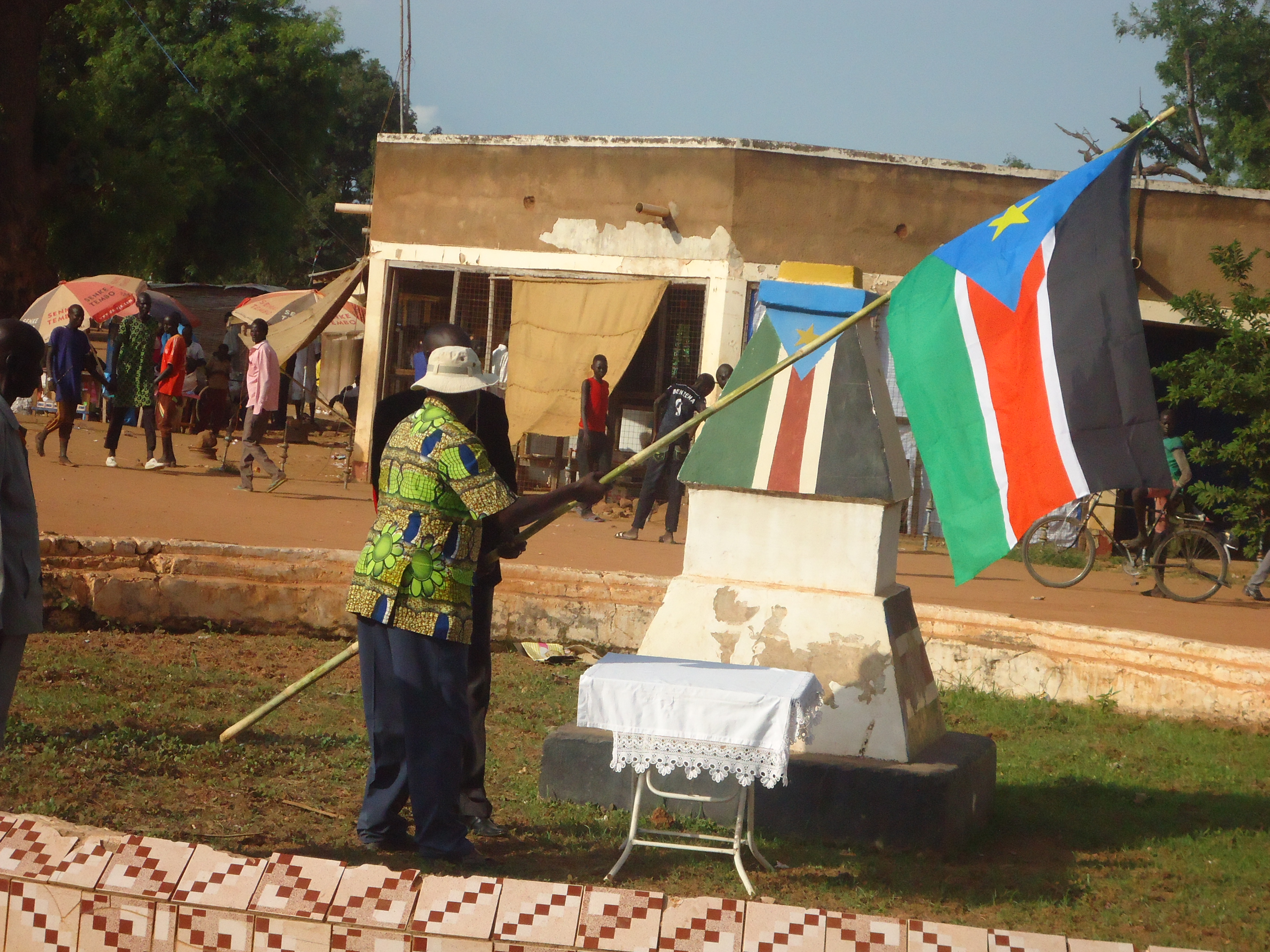
Man with South Sudan flag, 2011

=== Colours ===
While no officially standardized colour codes have ever been set by any legal document, on 25 August 2023, the Media Authority of South Sudan released an advisory discouraging the use of darker shades of blue (which had previously been commonplace in both official and unofficial settings). It is illegal in South Sudan to distribute an incorrect reproduction of the flag.

== Symbolism and representation ==
The South Sudanese government specifies that the colours of the flag are there to represent these descriptions of South Sudan:

- Black: Represents the people of South Sudan.
- Red: Represents blood that was shed for the independence of the country.
- Green: Represents the country's agricultural, natural wealth, land, as well as progress.
- White: Represents peace.
- Blue: Represents waters of the Nile River, a source of life.
- Yellow: Represents unity (of the states), hope, and determination for all people.

== Historical flags ==
=== South Sudan as part of Anglo-Egyptian Sudan ===
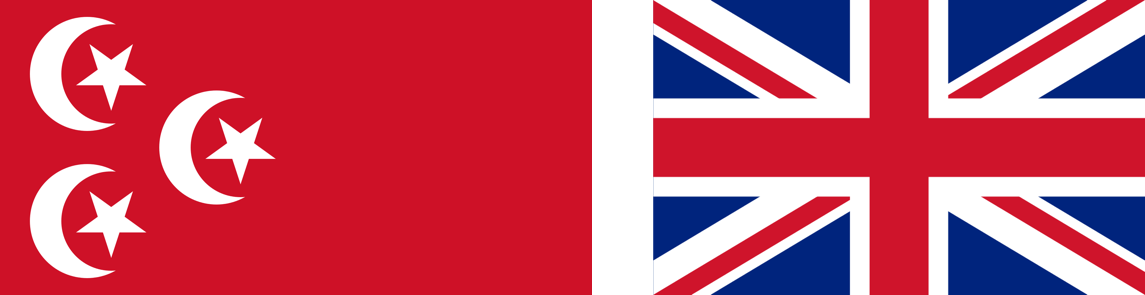
Flags used in Anglo-Egyptian Sudan (1914–1922)

Flags used in Anglo-Egyptian Sudan (1922–1955)

Provisional flag of Sudan used during the Afro-Asian Conference (April 1955).

=== South Sudan as part of the Republic of Sudan ===
National Flag of Sudan used in South Sudan (1956–1970)

National Flag of Sudan used in South Sudan (1970–2011)

Flag of Gordon Muortat Mayen's Nile Provisional Government (NPG) and self-declared Nile Republic (1969–1971)

Flag of Southern Sudan used by South Sudan (2005–2011)

=== South Sudan as the independent Republic of South Sudan ===
Flag of South Sudan (2011–2023), using dark blue triangle.

Flag of South Sudan (2011–2023), using dark blue triangle and tilted star.

== Other flags ==
=== Government flags ===
Standard of the president of South Sudan.

Flag of the British governor general (used in Anglo-Egyptian Sudan).

=== Military flags ===
Flag of the South Sudan People's Defence Forces (Note: Known as the Sudan People's Liberation Army from 1983 to 2018) (2011–present)

Flag of the South Sudan People's Defence Forces (until 2011)

Flag of the Sudan Defence Force (1925–1956; used in Anglo-Egyptian Sudan)

Roundel of the South Sudan Air Force

=== Political party flags ===
Including militant organizations barred from participation in electoral politics.

Flag used by the Sudan People's Liberation Movement (1983–1995)

Flag used by the Sudan People's Liberation Movement (1995)

Flag used by the Sudan People's Liberation Movement

Flag used by the Sudan People's Liberation Movement

Flag of the South Sudan Liberation Movement

Flag of the National Salvation Front

Flag of the United Democratic Front

Flag of the Anyanya (1963–1972)

Flag of the Azania Liberation Front (1965–1970)

Flag of SPLA-Nasir (1991–2002)

=== Miscellaneous flags ===
One of the many flags flown in the capital of South Sudan on Independence Day.

Flag of the Dinka people

Flag of the Bari people

Flag of the Nuer White Army

== Sub-national flags ==
South Sudan has ten states, two administrative areas and one area with special administrative status. The ten states have adopted state flags.

=== States ===
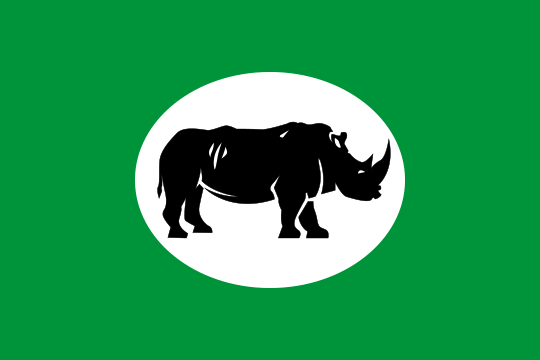
Central Equatoria

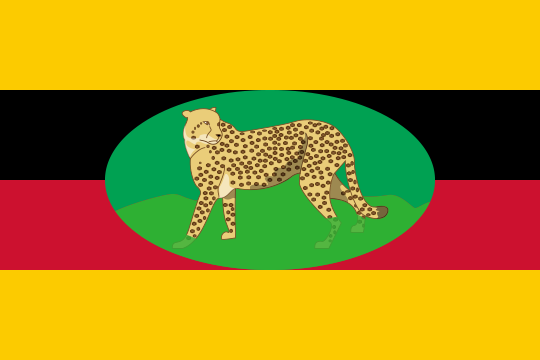
Eastern Equatoria

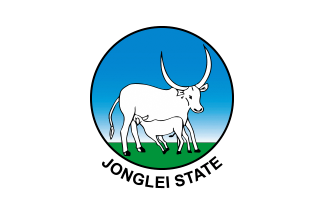
Jonglei

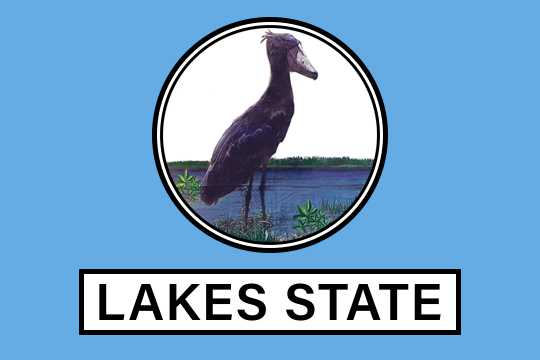
Lakes State

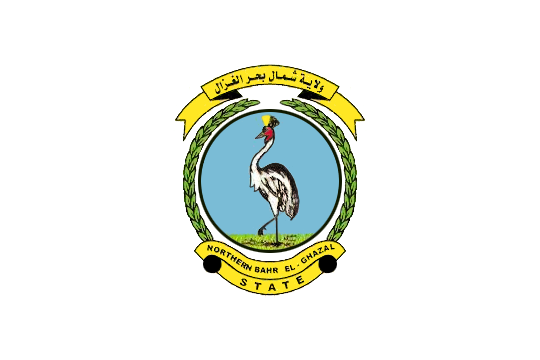
Northern Bahr el Ghazal

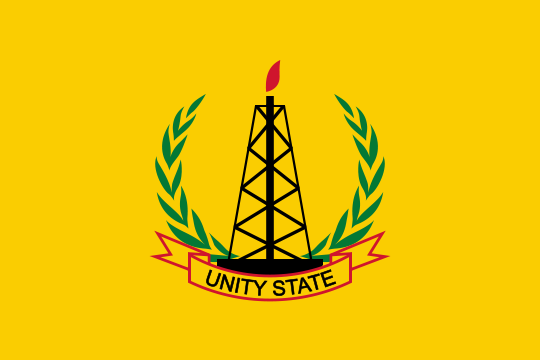
Unity State

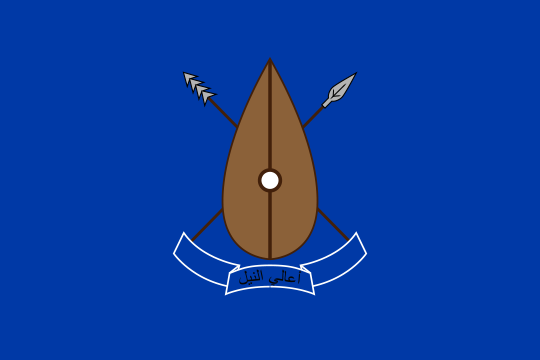
Upper Nile

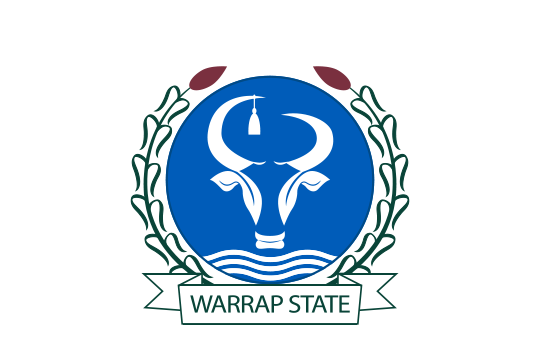
Warrap

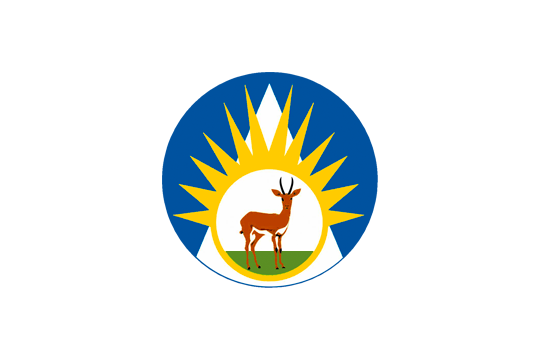
Western Bahr el Ghazal

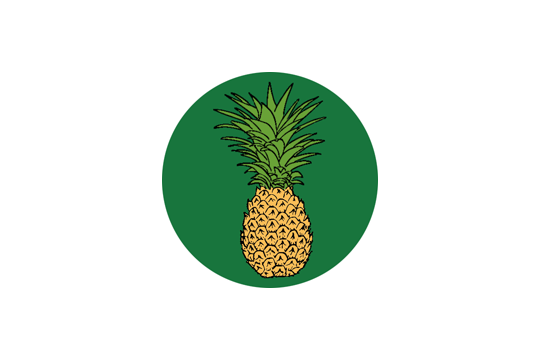
Western Equatoria

=== Administrative areas ===
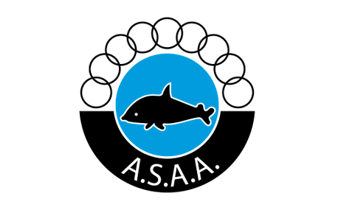
Abyei Special Administrative Area

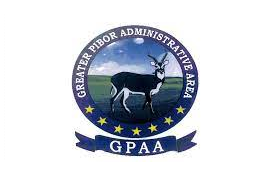
Greater Pibor Administrative Area

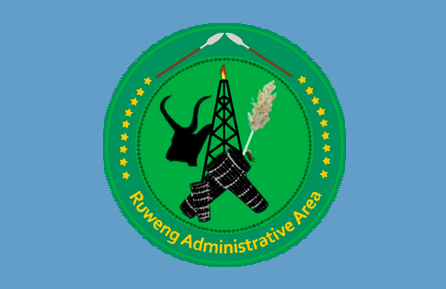
Ruweng Administrative Area

== See also ==
- Coat of arms of South Sudan
- List of South Sudanese flags
- South Sudan Oyee!
