= Manasseh Lomole Waya =

South Sudanese politician

Manasseh Lomole Waya is a South Sudanese politician. He has served as Deputy Governor and Minister of Education of Central Equatoria since 2005 under Governor Clement Wani Konga.
