= South Sudan, Oyee! =

National anthem of South Sudan

English: South Sudan, Hurrah!
- National anthem of South Sudan
- Lyrics: Unknown, 2011
- Music: University of Juba, 2011
- Adopted: 9 July 2011; 15 years ago

Audio sample
- U.S. Navy Band instrumental version: file; help

"South Sudan, Oyee!" is the national anthem of South Sudan; it was selected by the South Sudan National Anthem Committee of the Sudan People's Liberation Movement following the launch of a competition to find a national anthem in August 2010. This preceded the independence referendum in January 2011 that led to South Sudan becoming a sovereign state on 9 July 2011. "Oyee!" is an equivalent of "Hurrah!"

== History ==
The committee received 49 entries for the anthem. The working title of the winning entry was "Land of Kush". A competition was held on live television in 2010.

The winning music was composed by students and teachers of Juba University.

The original version was drafted by Dr. Achier Deng Akol in 2005, following the Comprehensive Peace Agreement, when it became clear that South Sudan may become independent. This original version, entitled "South Sudan Oyee", underwent improvement via specialised committees headed by Sudan People's Liberation Army General Malak Awien and former Minister of Information of South Sudan Dr. Barnaba Martial Benjamin.

== Lyrics ==
Oh God
We praise and glorify You
For Your grace on South Sudan
Land of great abundance
Uphold us united in peace and harmony.

Oh Motherland
We rise raising flag with the guiding star
And singing songs of freedom with joy;
For justice, liberty and prosperity
Shall forever more reign!

Oh great patriots
Let us stand up in silence and respect,
Saluting our martyrs whose blood
Cemented our national foundation,
We vow to protect our nation.

Oh God, bless South Sudan!

== See also ==
- Flag of South Sudan
- Coat of arms of South Sudan
