= Mary Karlino Madut =

South Sudanese politician

Mary Karlino Madut is a South Sudanese politician. She has served as Minister of Parliamentary Affairs of Western Bahr el Ghazal since 18 May 2010. In 2025, she was appointed as the State Minister for Gender, Child, and Social Welfare for the Western Bahr el Ghazal state, which seats in the state's capital, Wau.

It is also thought that Mary Karlino Madut was appointed as the new State Minister for Information, Communication, and Culture in 2015, after the governor, Rizik Zackaria Hassan, relieved the entire cabinet from their duties.

Earlier, in 2011, Madut had said that " African cultures impeded women's participation in political and community life, as women were mostly charged with domestic duties".
