= Clement Maring =

South Sudanese politician

Clement Maring is a South Sudanese politician. He has served as Commissioner of Terekeka County, Central Equatoria since 2005.

== See also ==
- Politics of South Sudan
