= Baptist Sabit Frances =

South Sudanese politician

Baptist Sabit Frances is a South Sudanese politician. He has served as Minister of Information and Communications of Western Bahr el Ghazal since 18 May 2010.
