= Batali Hill =

Hill in Chittagong, Bangladesh

Coordinates: 22.3440°N 91.8161°E

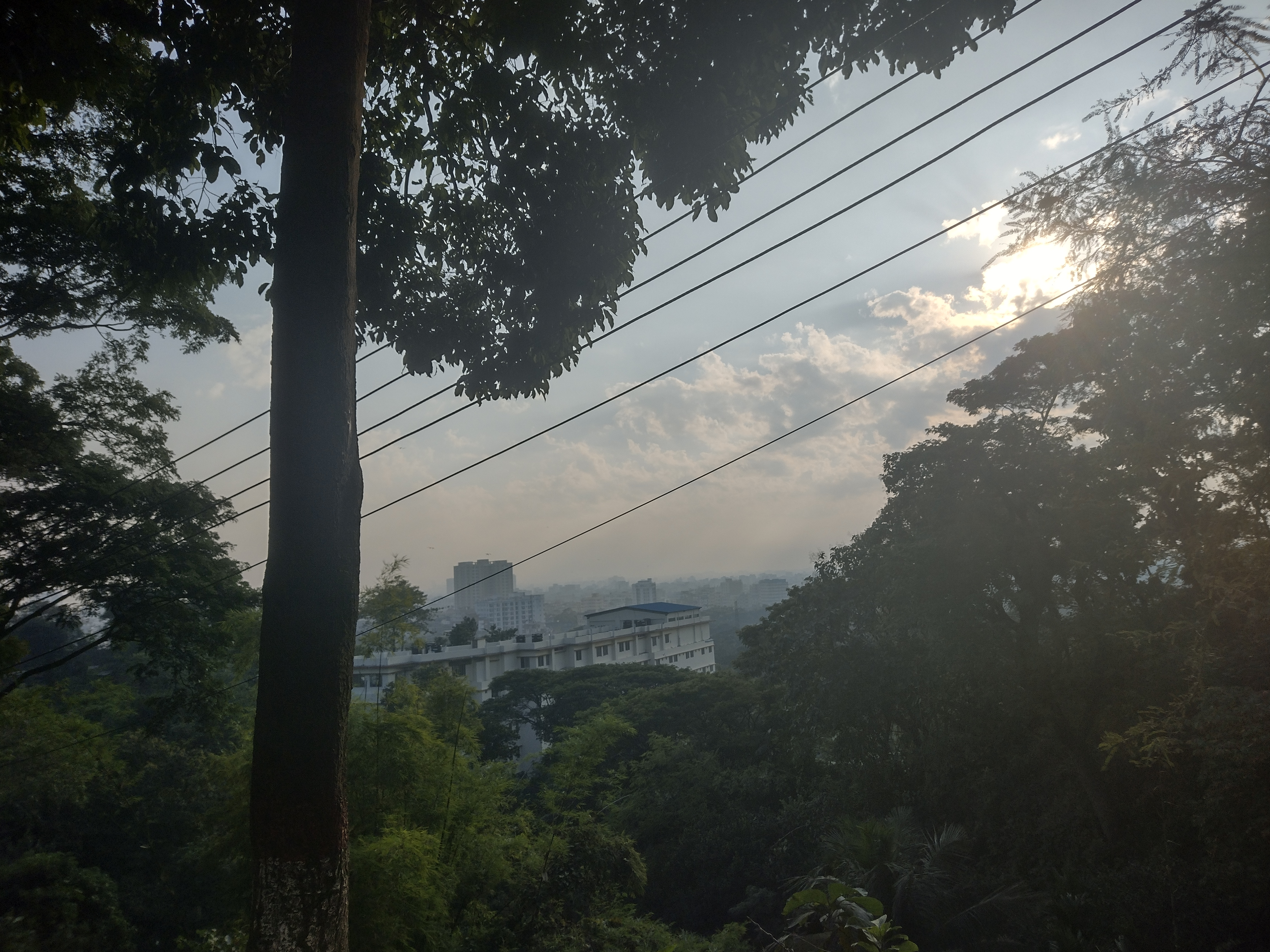
Batali Hill

Batali Hill is the highest hill in the city of Chittagong, Bangladesh. It is located near the Tiger Pass crossing, about 1 kilometre from the center of the city, and falls under Khulshi Thana.

About 280 feet high, the hill faces threats of erosion and landslides due to illegal hill-cutting activities. In June, 2007, a massive landslide in the area surrounding Batali Hill killed at least 128 people.

There is also an eternal flame (Shikha Onirban) commemorating the Bangladesh Liberation War martyrs
