= Vincent Kujo Lubong =

South Sudanese politician

- Born: Juba, Sudan

Vincent Kujo Lubong is a South Sudanese politician. He was appointed to the position of Security Advisor for the state of Central Equatoria in 2011.
