= Felix Ladu =

South Sudanese physician and politician

Felix Ladu is a South Sudanese physician and politician. As of 2011, he is the Health Advisor for the state of Central Equatoria.
