= Paul Lodu Bureng =

South Sudanese politician

Professor Paul Lodu Bureng is a South Sudanese politician. As of 2011, he was the Minister of Animal Resources and Fisheries of Central Equatoria under Governor Clement Wani Konga.
