= Judiciary of South Sudan =

National Judicial System

The Judiciary of Southern Sudan, or JOSS, is a constitutionally mandated government branch that oversees the court systems of South Sudan. The Chief Justice of the Supreme Court of South Sudan is the head of the judiciary, and is held accountable to his job by the President of South Sudan.

The current Chief Justice is Justice Benjamin Baak Deng Bol. The institution was created after the Comprehensive Peace Agreement took effect in 2005.

The highest court is the Supreme Court of South Sudan. The second tier involves the Courts of Appeal; below the Courts of Appeal are the High Courts, and below those are the County Courts. Other courts and tribunals on smaller scales will be created as deemed necessary.
