= Richard Remo =

South Sudanese politician

Richard Remo is a South Sudanese politician. He has served as Commissioner of Headquarters of Central Equatoria since 2005.
