= John Lodu Tombe =

South Sudanese politician

John Lodu Tombe is a South Sudanese politician. As of 2011, he was the Minister of Physical Infrastructure of Central Equatoria under Governor Clement Wani Konga.
