= Juma Saeed Worju =

South Sudanese politician

Juma Saeed Worju is a South Sudanese politician. As of 2011, he was the Minister of Environment of Central Equatoria.
