= John Malish Dujuk =

South Sudanese politician (1976–2019)

John Malish Dujuk (March 3, 1976 – November 3, 2019) was a South Sudanese politician. In 2011, he was the Minister of Parliamentary Affairs and served Central Equatoria from 2011 to 2013.
