= Paterno Legge =

South Sudanese politician

Paterno Legge is a South Sudanese politician. As of 2011, he is the Minister of Local Government of Central Equatoria.
