= Muki Batali =

South Sudanese politician

Muki Batali is a South Sudanese politician. He has served as Commissioner of Kajo Keji County, Central Equatoria since 2005.
