= Emmanuel Ija =

South Sudanese physician and politician

Dr. Emmanuel Ija is a South Sudanese physician and politician. As of 2011, he is the Minister of Health of Central Equatoria.
