= Water for South Sudan =

Nonprofit corporation dedicated to drilling wells in South Sudan

- Formation: 2003; 23 years ago
- Founder: Salva Dut
- Type: NGO
- Registration no.: 20-0291592
- Legal status: 501(c)(3)
- Purpose: Humanitarian
- Headquarters: Rochester, New York; Wau, South Sudan
- Region served: Rural South Sudan
- Board President: Bob Shea
- Executive Director: Lynn Malooly
- Chief Strategy Director: Salva Dut
- Website: waterforsouthsudan.org

Water for South Sudan (formerly known as Water for Sudan) is an American nonprofit 501(c)(3) corporation founded in 2003 to drill wells, deliver hygiene education, and provide sanitation services to South Sudan.

Their website states that their mission is to

"deliver sustainable quality-of-life services to the people of South Sudan by efficiently providing access to clean, safe water, and improving hygiene and sanitation practices in areas of great need."

The operations team, based in Wau, South Sudan, mainly performs work in remote villages in the Bahr el-Ghazal region of South Sudan. Administrative headquarters are located in Rochester, NY.

== History ==
In 2003, former "Lost Boy" of Sudan, Salva Dut, founded Water for South Sudan in Rochester, NY. Salva's story began in 1974 when he was born in a rural village in southwestern Sudan to a tribe of Dinka people. When Salva was 11 years old, in 1985, Sudan was wracked by the Second Sudanese Civil War. During this war, the "militia killed, plundered, burned, and raped their way through a huge swathe of Southern Sudan from 1985 to 1989". During this time, millions died and millions more were displaced, fleeing to refugee camps in Ethiopia, Kenya and other neighboring countries. When the fighting reached Salva's village, he was separated from his family and joined thousands of other children, mostly boys, known as the Lost Boys of Sudan who had to seek safety on foot in refugee camps in Ethiopia and Kenya.

After living in refugee camps for 10 years, Salva received an opportunity to move to the US in 1996. Several years after living in the US, Salva learned that his father was still alive in Southern Sudan but was suffering with disease caused by waterborne parasites. Hearing of his father's illness inspired Salva to help both his father and his country by bringing clean water to those in need. That was the beginning of Water for South Sudan. Salva's story is told in the New York Times bestseller A Long Walk to Water by Linda Sue Park.

Two years after the founding of WFSS, in 2005, after over two decades of war, the Comprehensive Peace Agreement was signed. This was the culmination of peace negotiations to find a comprehensive, lasting solution to the conflict that had divided north and south Sudan. After the truce was declared, the semi-autonomous Government of Southern Sudan was established for that region.

== Operations ==
=== Water Wells ===
In 2005, the first drilling operations began. WFSS drilled five wells in Sudanese villages in the first year. Since then, over 500 wells have been drilled (as of May 2021), each serving approximately 500–1,000 people and pumping 1,800 gallons of water per day. During the drilling season from December to June each year, WFSS aims to drill 40 to 50 wells, each taking 3 to 4 days to build.

People in the villages where (WFSS) operates become partners in the process of making safe, drinkable water available there. The WFSS team trains the well manager and provides spare parts. To help with repairs, in 2017, WFSS launched its well rehabilitation program. The well rehab team returns to older wells to repair broken parts and upgrade the cement platforms around the wells.

=== Hygiene Education ===
In each village where WFSS drills a well, they also offer a 3-day hygiene education program taught by one of their two hygiene teams. Key topics include personal hygiene, safe water practices, food safety, safe disposal of waste, and women's hygiene.

Salva Dut
- Born: 1 December 1974 (age 51); Southern Sudan
- Known for: Philanthropy
- Father: Mawien Dut

== Salva Dut ==
Salva Dut is a philanthropist and the founder of Water for South Sudan.

Dut was born on 1 December 1974. in Southern Sudan. His story is told in the book A Long Walk to Water, written by Linda Sue Park. He was living in Sudan while the Sudanese Civil War took place. He fled to a refugee camp in Ethiopia, which he lived in until he fled to Kenya while the camp closed down. He then lived in another refugee camp there. He rediscovered his father, Mawien Dut Ariik in January 2002, who he had not seen in 16 years. Mawien died in June 2023. Dut was educated at the Monroe Community College.

== See also ==
- A Long Walk to Water – Children's book with fictionalized version of Dut's story
