= Stephen Lemi Lokuron =

South Sudanese politician

Stephen Lemi Lokuron is a South Sudanese politician. As of 2011, he is the Minister of Labour and Public Service of Central Equatoria.
