= Hellen Murshali =

South Sudanese politician

Hellen Murshali Boro

Minister of Social Welfare of Central Equatoria
- Incumbent
- Assumed office 2011

Personal details
- Citizenship: South Sudanese
- Occupation: Politician • Social worker

Hellen Murshali Boro is a South Sudanese politician and social worker. In 2011, she served as the Minister of Social Welfare of Central Equatoria. She later worked with the Central Equatoria State Ministry of Gender, Children and Social Welfare. In 2017, Murshali Boro became the Executive Director of Confident Children out of Conflict (CCC), an organization dedicated to helping orphans and neglected children in South Sudan.
