= Francis Barsan =

South Sudanese politician

Francis Barsan is a South Sudanese politician. As of 2011, he was the Minister of Culture, Information, Youth, Sports, Hotels, and Tourism of Central Equatoria.
