= Michael Tongun =

South Sudanese politician

Michael Tongun is a South Sudanese politician. As of 2011, he is the Minister of Co-Operatives & Rural Development of Central Equatoria.
