= South Sudan Scout Association =

National Scouting organization of South Sudan

- Country: South Sudan
- Founded: 2011
- Membership: 2000

The South Sudan Scout Association is the national Scouting organization of South Sudan. It was founded in 2011 following the independence of South Sudan, which became an independent country on July 9, 2011, at which moment the organization split from the Sudan Scouts Association, a member of the World Organization of the Scout Movement. In January 2013, the organization had about 2000 members.

The organization operates the Rejaf Scouts Farm in Juba. As a fledgling organization in a troubled area, some of the problem areas include lack of leadership training, training equipment, training materials, Scout badges, camping equipment, uniforms and books.

== History ==
Scouting in South Sudan was started in the 1950s as part of the Sudan Scouts Association. In 2011, after the independence of the country, Scout groups from seven of the ten states of South Sudan founded the South Sudan Scout Association. In the second half of 2012, the organization applied for membership in the World Organization of the Scout Movement.

The South Sudan Scouts Association became an official member of WOSM on 1 May 2013. As such, South Sudan became a member of the Africa Scout Region, but is also supported by the Arab Scout Region for its Arabic-speaking members.
