= Sudan Scouts Association =

National Scouting organization of Sudan

- جمعية الكشافة السودانية
- Country: Sudan
- Founded: 1935
- Membership: 14,868
- Affiliation: World Organization of the Scout Movement
- Website https://www.sudanscout.org/

The Sudan Scouts Association (Arabic: جمعية الكشافة السودانية Gamiat el-Kashâfah es-Sudanya) is the national Scouting organization of Sudan. It was officially founded in 1935, and became a member of the World Organization of the Scout Movement in 1956. The boys-only Sudan Scouts Association has 14,868 members as of 2011.,

Scouting in Sudan was begun in 1916 in Atbarah by Harry Jackson. Scouting developed slowly in the following years, spreading to Khartoum in 1919 and followed by Girl Guides in 1928.

Sudanese Scouts are active in serving the community in leprosy projects, AIDS prevention, family planning, health awareness and many other projects in cooperation with other organizations such as the United Nations.

The outdoor life is one of the fundamental activities in Sudan. The country has many forests and jungles suitable for outdoor camping and hiking activities.

== Program and sections ==
- Cub Scouts-06 to 11 years
- Boy Scouts-12 to 15 years
- Senior Boy Scouts-15 to 17 years
- Rover Scouts-18 to 24 years

Sudan has had Air Scout groups since 1976, Sea Scout groups since 1969, and Technological Scout groups since 2016. The group is subdivided into small units or troops according to their ages.

The Scout Motto is Kun Musta'idan or كن مستعداً, translating as "Be Prepared" in Arabic. The noun for a single Scout is Kashaf or كشاف in Arabic.

== South Sudan ==
South Sudan became an independent country on July 9, 2011, at which time the organizations split.

== See also ==
- The Sudan Girl Guides Association
