= South Sudan Supreme Court =

The South Sudan Supreme Court is the highest court in South Sudan. The President of the South Sudan Supreme Court is Chan Reec Madut, since August 15, 2011. Before, the President was John Woul Makec.
