= Coat of arms of South Sudan =

Versions
- Seal
- Armiger: Republic of South Sudan
- Adopted: July 2011; 14 years ago
- Motto: Justice, Liberty, Prosperity

The coat of arms of the Republic of South Sudan was adopted in July 2011 following independence from the Republic of Sudan. Prior to independence, South Sudan was an autonomous region of Sudan.

The design of the coat of arms was approved by the cabinet of the autonomous Government of Southern Sudan in April 2011, having previously been endorsed by the Southern Sudan Legislative Assembly in May 2011.

== Design ==
The arms consist of an escutcheon with the tincture or (gold). The supporter is an African fish eagle holding a crossed spear and spade, symbolizing the people's resolve to protect the sovereignty of their republic and work hard to feed it, described in some press accounts as a shield and two spears. The eagle is depicted as looking towards its right shoulder with wings outstretched, and it holds in its claws a scroll bearing the name of the state. The eagle signifies strength, resilience, vision, and majesty.

== History ==
=== Pre Independence ===
Prior to independence, South Sudan was part of The Ottoman Empire, The Anglo-Egyptian Sudan, The Belgian Lado Enclave and then an autonomous region of Sudan.

Seal of The Turco-Egyptian Sudan (1820–1885)

Coat of Arms of The Lado Enclave (1894–1910)

Emblem of The Anglo-Egyptian Sudan (1941–1952)

National emblem of the Republic of the Sudan from 1956 to 1970.

Emblem of the Democratic Republic of the Sudan between 1970 and 1985.

Emblem of the Republic of the Sudan between 1985 and 2011.

=== Southern Sudan Autonomous Region (2005–2011) ===
The Southern Sudan Autonomous Region, that existed between 2005 and 2011, used an emblem consisting of the coat of arms of Sudan surrounded by the legends "GOVERNMENT OF SOUTHERN SUDAN" and "GOSS". The arms of Sudan depict a secretarybird bearing a traditional shield. Two scrolls are placed on the arms; the upper one displays the national motto, 'OUR VICTORY', and the lower one displays the title of the state, 'REPUBLIC OF THE SUDAN' in the English language.

Another emblem was also used by some agencies and offices of the autonomous Government of Southern Sudan. This coat of arms was similar to the arms of neighbouring Commonwealth states Kenya and Uganda. It depicted a traditional African shield with the design of the Flag of Southern Sudan, crossed by lances. The shield was supported by a shoebill and a rhinoceros. The compartment depicted local crops and the waters of the River Nile with a scroll bearing the motto "JUSTICE, EQUALITY, DIGNITY".

Emblem of Southern Sudan (2005–2011)

Unofficial coat of arms (2005–2011)

== Sub-national emblems ==
Some of the states and areas of South Sudan have adopted seals or emblems for official purposes.

=== States ===
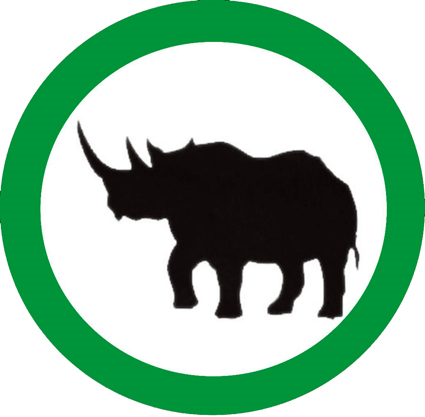
Central Equatoria

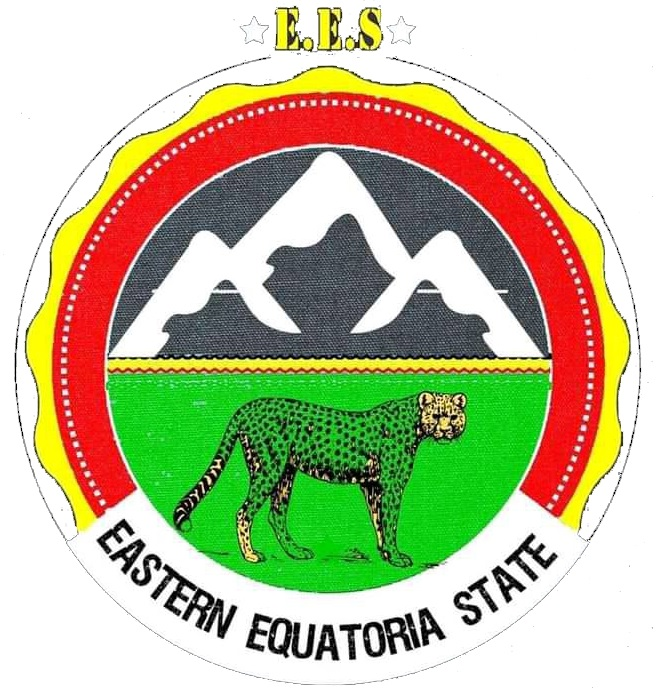
Eastern Equatoria

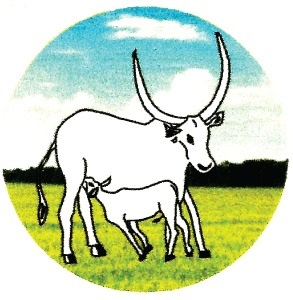
Jonglei State

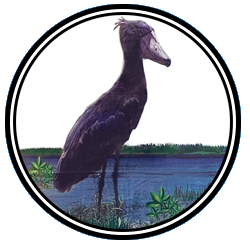
Lakes State

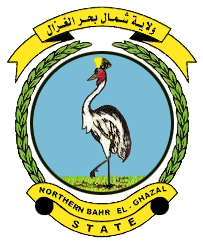
Northern Bahr el Ghazal

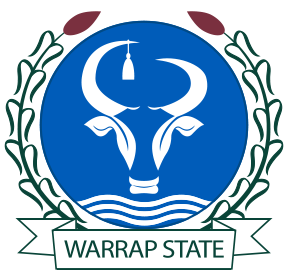
Warrap State

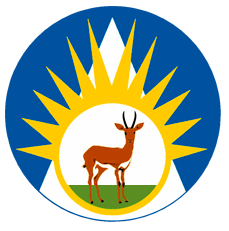
Western Bahr el Ghazal

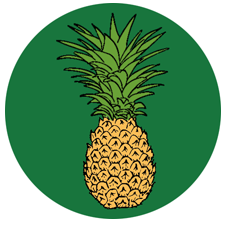
Western Equatoria

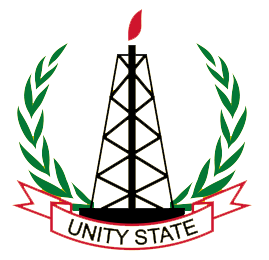
Unity State

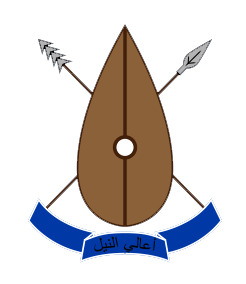
Upper Nile State

=== Administrative areas ===
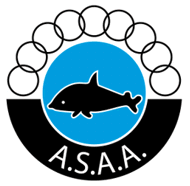
Abyei Area

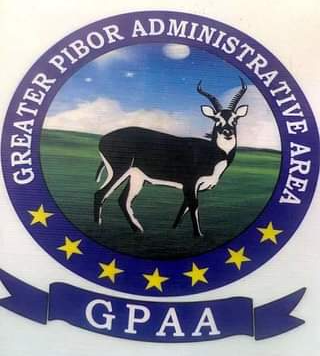
Greater Pibor Administrative Area

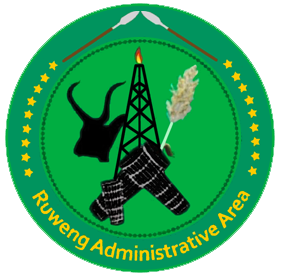
Ruweng Administrative Area

=== Municipalities ===
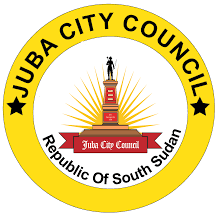
Juba

== See also ==
- Flag of South Sudan
- National anthem of South Sudan
