= Constitution of Southern Sudan =

The Constitution of Southern Sudan was the 2005 Interim Constitution of Southern Sudan, as established by the Government of Sudan and the Sudan People's Liberation Army/Movement within the framework of the Comprehensive Peace Agreement ending the Second Sudanese Civil War, signed into practice on 9 January 2005.

The constitution establishes a presidential system of government headed by a president who is both the head of state, head of government, and commander-in-chief of the armed forces.

The constitution establishes English and Arabic as the official languages. (Note: "Section 4 Para 2: English shall be the official language in Southern Sudan and the Government of Southern Sudan shall develop indigenous national languages. Each state government may, after considering its peculiar and prevailing circumstances and level of development of its national languages, adopt and use them as official languages and media of instruction in schools and other institutions.")

The constitution establishes three levels of government: national, state and local. (Note: Section 26 Sub a–d:The Sudan is a decentralized State, with the following levels of government: a) The National level of government which shall exercise authority so as to protect and promote the national sovereignty of Sudan and the welfare of its people; [obsolete upon gaining independence] b) The Southern Sudan level of Government which shall exercise authority in respect of the people and States in the South; c) The state governments throughout Sudan which shall exercise authority at the state level and render public services through the level of government close to the people; and d) The level of local government throughout the Sudan.")

The constitution prohibits slavery, (Note: "Section 32 Para 1: No one shall be held in slavery; slavery and the slave trade in all their forms shall be prohibited.") and torture, (Note: "Section 35 Para 1: No one shall be subjected to torture or to cruel, inhuman or degrading treatment or punishment;") limits capital punishment, (Note: "Section 38 Para 1: No death penalty shall be passed save as retribution or punishment for extremely serious offences in accordance with the law;") and establishes equal rights for men and women, (Note: "Section 34 Para 1: The equal rights of men and women to the enjoyment of all civil and political rights and all economic, social, and cultural rights shall be ensured;") and equality before the law. (Note: "Section 33 Para 1: All persons are equal before the law and are entitled without any discrimination, as to race, colour, sex, language, religious creed, political or other opinion, national or social origin, age, disability, ethnicity, birth, marital status, pregnancy or other status, to the equal protection of the law;")

The separate "Transitional Constitution of the Republic of South Sudan" was drafted by a Southern Sudan Constitutional Drafting Committee and adopted by a two-thirds majority vote of the South Sudan Legislative Assembly. (Note: " Section 2 Para 1: The Government of Southern Sudan shall function in accordance with a Southern Sudan Constitution, which shall be drafted by an inclusive Southern Sudan Constitutional Drafting Committee and adopted by the Transitional Assembly of Southern Sudan by a two- thirds majority of all members. It shall conform with the Interim National Constitution, [sic]") This new constitution came in force on 9 July 2011 when South Sudan was proclaimed as independent state.
