= Constitution of South Sudan =

Right of citizens

The Transitional Constitution of the Republic of South Sudan, 2011 was drafted by a Southern Sudan Constitutional Drafting Committee. It was published in April 2011.

A version of the constitution was ratified on 7 July 2011 by the South Sudan Legislative Assembly. It came into force on the day of the independence of South Sudan (9 July 2011) after being signed by the president of the republic. The Constitution replaced the existing 2005 Interim Constitution of Southern Sudan. The constitution establishes a presidential system of government headed by a president who is the head of state, head of government, and commander-in-chief of the armed forces.

== Background ==
Work on a transitional constitution began on 21 January 2011 with the formation of a technical review committee, empowered by presidential decree, to amend the 2005 Interim Constitution of Southern Sudan. After the January 2011 referendum in favour of secession, the ruling Sudan People's Liberation Movement (SPLM) and various opposition political parties broadly agreed on the need to adopt a transitional constitution based on the ICOSS and tailored to the enhanced powers and responsibilities of a sovereign state.

From the outset, the drafting process has been limited to a technical review of the ICOSS that would delete all references to a united Sudan and re-cast existing government structures in the south at a regional level as the institutions of a sovereign nation-state. Shortly before Independence, the then GoSS Minister of Legal Affairs and Constitutional Development, Mr John Luk Jok, chairperson of the technical constitutional review committee said that a second phase of the Constitutional review process would get underway after Independence.

In April 2011, the technical review committee presented its recommendations on the transitional constitution to the office of the Southern Sudanese presidency, along with its proposals for the making of a permanent political charter.
