= Salva Kiir =

President of South Sudan since 2011

His Excellency Salva Kiir
- Kiir in 2026

1st President of South Sudan
- Incumbent
- Assumed office 9 July 2011
- Vice President: First: Riek Machar (2011–2026); Vacant (2026–); Second: Benjamin Bol Mel (2025); James Wani Igga (2013–2025), (2025–2026); Vacant (2026–); Third: Taban Deng Gai (2020–2026); Vacant (2026–); Fourth: Rebecca Nyandeng De Mabior (2020–2026); Vacant (2026–); Fifth: Josephine Lagu (2025–2026); Hussein Abdelbagi (2020–2025), (2026); Vacant (2026–)
- Preceded by: Position established

2nd President of Southern Sudan
- In office 30 July 2005 (Note: Acting: 30 July – 11 August 2005) – 9 July 2011
- Vice President: Riek Macharudan
- Preceded by: John Garang
- Succeeded by: Position abolished

First Vice President of Sudan
- In office 11 August 2005 – 9 July 2011
- President: Omar al-Bashir
- Preceded by: John Garang
- Succeeded by: Ali Osman Taha

3rd Vice President of Southern Sudan
- In office 9 July 2005 – 11 August 2005
- President: John Garang; Himself (acting)
- Preceded by: Position established
- Succeeded by: Riek Machar

Personal details
- Born: Salva Kiir Mayardit; 13 September 1951 (age 75) Akon, Anglo-Egyptian Sudan (present-day Gogrial, South Sudan)
- Party: Sudan People's Liberation Movement
- Spouse(s): Mary Ayen Mayardit; Aluel William Nyuon Bany
- Children: 2

Military service
- Allegiance: Anyanya (1967–1972); Democratic Republic of the Sudan (1972–1983); SPLA (1983–2011); South Sudan (2011–present)
- Years of service: 1967–present
- Rank: Field Marshal
- Commands: South Sudan People's Defence Forces; Sudan People's Liberation Army; Anyanya Battalion
- Battles/wars: First Sudanese Civil War; Second Sudanese Civil War; South Sudanese Civil War; Heglig Crisis

Salva Kiir Mayardit (born 13 September 1951) is a South Sudanese politician who has served as the President of South Sudan since its independence on 9 July 2011. Prior to independence, he was the President of the Government of Southern Sudan, as well as First Vice President of Sudan, from 2005 to 2011. He was named Commander-in-Chief of the Sudan People's Liberation Army (SPLA) in 2005, following the death of John Garang.

Kiir was born to the Dinka ethnic group and joined Anyanya rebels fighting for Southern independence during the First Sudanese Civil War in 1967. Following the outbreak of the Second Sudanese Civil War in 1983, Kiir joined the new Sudan People's Liberation Movement (SPLM) rebel group led by John Garang as a member of its armed wing, the Sudanese People's Liberation Army (SPLA), eventually becoming the head of the SPLA. Following the Comprehensive Peace Agreement, the South gained autonomy under the leadership of Garang in July 2005. After Garang died at the end of the month, Kiir became the new President of the Southern Autonomous region, as well as First Vice President of the central government. Kiir won re-election as President following the 2010 South Sudanese general election. The following year, South Sudan gained independence after the 2011 South Sudanese independence referendum with Kiir as its inaugural President.

== Early life and childhood ==
Kiir was born in 1951 into a pastoral Dinka family in the village of Akon in the Awan-Chan Dinka community in Gogrial County, South Sudan, as the eighth of nine children (six boys and three girls) in the family. His father, Kuethpiny Thiik Atem (d. 2007), was a cattle herder who belonged to the Payum clan. Atem had three wives, Awiei Rou Wol, Adut Makuei Piol and Awien Akoon Deng, along with 16 children. Kiir's mother, Awiei Rou Wol Tong, was a farmer, who belonged to the Payii clan.

== Military career and role in the Sudanese civil wars ==
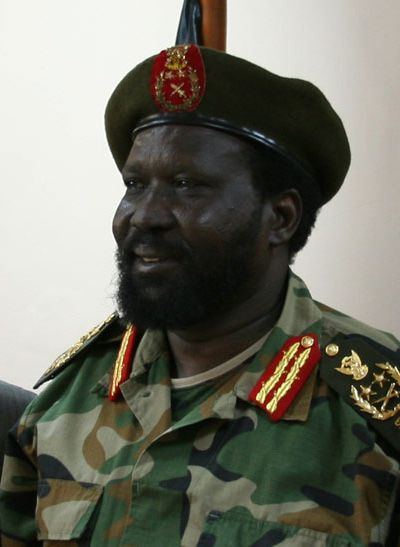
Salva Kiir Mayardit in military uniform

In 1967, Kiir joined the Anyanya rebel group in the First Sudanese Civil War. By the time of the 1972 Addis Ababa Agreement, he was a low-ranking officer and was integrated into the Sudanese Armed Forces as per the agreement. In 1983, when John Garang joined an army mutiny he had been sent to put down, Kiir and other Southern leaders defected to the rebel Sudan People's Liberation Army/Movement (SPLA/M) in the second civil war. Garang had advanced military knowledge and experience from both the United States and Sudan, and Kiir served as his deputy. In 1997, Kiir commanded the SPLA troops that took part in Operation Thunderbolt, a very successful rebel offensive during which most of Western Equatoria was captured by the SPLA. Kiir eventually rose to head the SPLA, the SPLM's military wing, when Dr. John Garang was killed in a helicopter crash. Rumours to remove Kiir from his post as SPLA Chief of Staff in 2004 nearly caused the organization to split.

== South Sudanese politics ==
Following the signing of the Comprehensive Peace Agreement formally ending the war in January 2005, Garang was sworn in as the Vice President of the Republic of Sudan. After the death of John Garang De in a helicopter crash on 30 July 2005, Kiir was chosen to succeed to the post of First Vice President of Sudan and President of Southern Sudan. Before independence, Kiir was popular among the military wing of the SPLA/M for his loyalty to the vision of the SPLA/M throughout the liberation struggle and among those who do not trust the successive governments that have come and gone in the Sudan.

Comments by Kiir in October 2009 that the forthcoming independence referendum was a choice between being "a second class in your own country" or "a free person in your independent state" were expected to further strain political tensions. Reports in January 2010 that Kiir would not contest April elections for Sudanese president, but would focus on re-election as president of Southern Sudan were interpreted to mean that the SPLM priority was independence.

Kiir was re-elected with 93% of the vote in the 2010 South Sudanese election. Although the vote on both the national and sub-national level was criticized by democratic activists and international observers, the overwhelming margin of Kiir's re-election was noted by some media as being "Step One" in the process of secession. Following his re-election, Omar al-Bashir reappointed Kiir as the First Vice President of Sudan in accordance with the interim constitution.

Kiir called for international sanctions and a United Nations arms embargo on South Sudan to be lifted, citing the negative impact of both on South Sudanese progress and economic development.

== Presidency ==
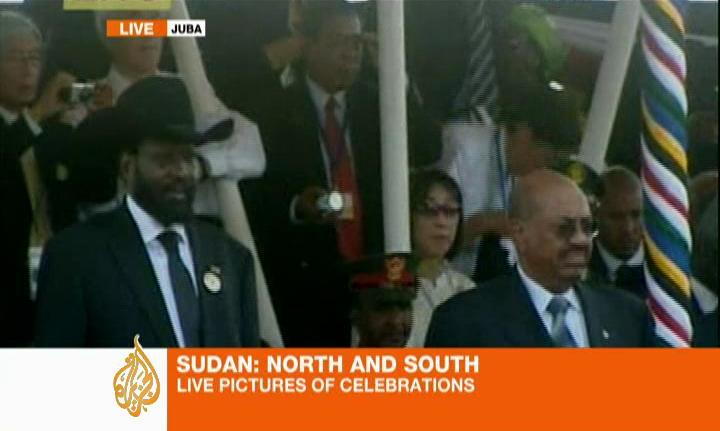
Omar al-Bashir (right), President of Sudan, watches a ceremony celebrating the founding of South Sudan with Kiir in 2011.

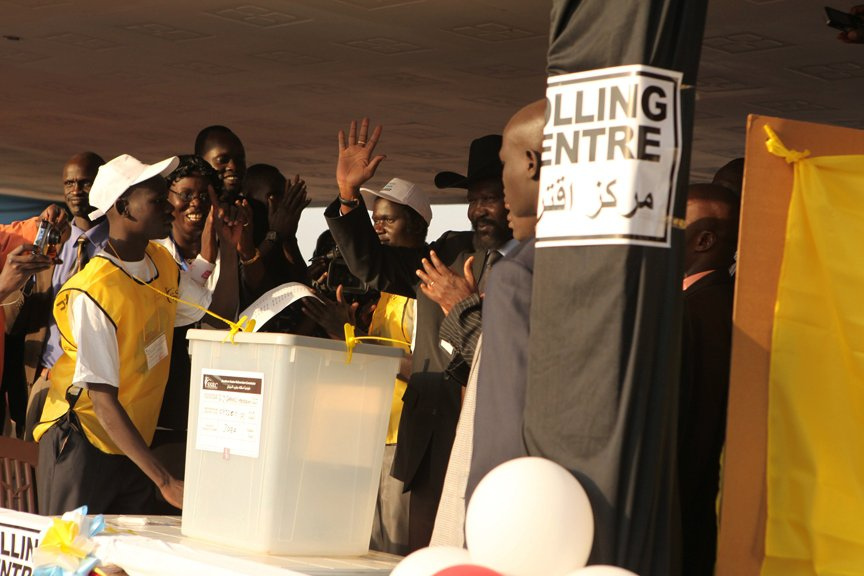
Kiir voting in the 2011 South Sudanese independence referendum

South Sudanese voted overwhelmingly in favor of their independence from Sudan in January 2011, with 98.83% of voters reportedly preferring to split from the North. On 9 July 2011, South Sudan became an independent state, with Kiir as its first president. Kiir positioned himself as a reformer, using his inaugural address to call for the South Sudanese people "to forgive though we shall not forget" injustices imposed at the hands of the northern Sudanese over the preceding decades and announce a general amnesty for South Sudanese groups that had warred against the SPLM in the past. A few weeks later, he publicly addressed members of the military and police to warn them that rape, torture, and other human rights violations carried out by armed personnel would be considered criminal acts and prosecuted aggressively by the Ministry of Justice. His presidency was characterized as a period of reconstruction, albeit one marred by internal and foreign disputes. Among these were the Heglig Crisis, which caused a border war with Sudan, and an internal political crisis in which attempts were made to overthrow him.

=== Domestic policy ===
On 18 June 2013, Kiir issued an order lifting the immunity of two ministers in the national government pending investigations into an alleged corruption case in which they appeared to be implicated. He also issued an order suspending Cabinet Affairs Minister Deng Alor Kuol and Finance Minister Kosti Manibe Ngai from their duties during the entire duration of the probe. In July 2013, Kiir sacked his entire cabinet, including his vice president, Riek Machar, ostensibly to reduce the size of government. However, Machar said that it was a step towards dictatorship and that he would challenge Kiir for the presidency. He also dismissed Taban Deng Gai as Governor of Unity State.

Kiir told Radio Netherlands Worldwide that homosexuality is not in the "character" of Southern Sudanese people. "It is not even something that anybody can talk about here in southern Sudan in particular. It is not there and if anybody wants to import or to export it to South Sudan, it will not get the support and it will always be condemned by everybody," he said. He then went on to refer to homosexuality as a "mental disease" and a "bastion of Western immorality".

In December 2011, 6,000 Lou Nuer armed child soldiers attacked Murle communities. According to investigations carried out by the UN, 800 people from both ethnic groups were killed between December 2011 and February 2012, while women and children were abducted and property was looted and destroyed. Unbeknownst to large numbers of or the entire child soldier population, Kiir planned and had decided to agree to warlike stipends from the Obama administration beginning in 2012, regardless of an American law prohibiting aid to nations utilizing child soldiers created and passed in 2008.

A lack of accountability and justice pertaining to the investigation, arrest and prosecution of the individuals who carried out the violence against civilians of both the Nuer and Murle ethnic groups is widely believed to have contributed massively to, if not categorically, the mass murders, as well as the continued perpetration of the ethnic violence. Kiir established a figurehead "Investigation Committee" with an ostentatious mandate to investigate those responsible for the mass murders and murders, but as of January 2013 no finances had been allocated to the "Investigation Committee" or any of its members sworn in to commence the investigation and bring those to justice.

Throughout the Jonglei disarmament "Operation Restore Peace" which began in March 2012 and continued throughout the year, soldiers were ordered to and assumed the responsibility of extrajudicial killings, severe beatings, binding people with rope, and torture to extract "information" regarding the whereabouts of weapons.

==== Consolidation of power ====
After rumors about a planned coup surfaced in Juba in late 2012, Kiir began reorganizing the senior leadership of his government, party and military on an unprecedented scale. In January 2013, he replaced the inspector general of the national police service with a lieutenant from the army, and dismissed six deputy chiefs of staff and 29 major generals in the army. In February 2013 Kiir retired an additional 117 army generals but this was viewed as troublesome in regards to a power grab by others. Kiir had also suggested that his rivals were trying to revive the rifts that had provoked infighting in the 1990s.

On 7 May 2013, Kiir dismissed legal advisor Justice Ajonye Perpetua and deputy Foreign Minister Elias Nyamlell Wako. Kiir had announced that he would no longer tolerate criticism by members of his cabinet. In July, Kiir sacked his entire cabinet, leading experts to warn of upcoming "a full-blown catastrophe". In December 2013, Kiir accused his vice President and other Party members of plotting a coup, leading him to arrest those politicians.

==== Murder and torture of journalists ====
Moi Peter Julius, who was a political reporter for a South Sudanese newspaper The Corporate, was found murdered late on the night of 19 August 2015 in a residential area of Juba after being shot twice from behind. His murder was committed three days after Kiir publicly and officially threatened journalists, stating that "freedom of the press does not mean that you work against your country. If anybody does not know that this country will kill people, we will demonstrate on them." Earlier in 2015, five journalists by the names of Musa Mohamed (the director of the state-run radio station Raja FM), Adam Juma (reporter and presenter for Raja FM), Dalia Marko and Randa George (reporters for Raja FM), and Boutros Martin (a cameraman for the Western Bahr el Ghazal of South Sudan Television) had been murdered while traveling as part of a convoy, along with six other people. Tom Rhodes of the Committee to Protect Journalists stated after the murders that "The murder of five journalists is a devastating attack on South Sudan's already beleaguered press corps," and that "We urge Western Bahr el Ghazal authorities to do their utmost to identify the perpetrators and bring them to justice, and to ensure journalists are allowed to carry out their duties safely." At present, none of the parties responsible for ordering the murders or perpetrators of the crimes have been arrested, charged, or convicted.

In December 2022, Kiir lost control of his bladder and urinated into his clothing during a road opening ceremony. Six staff of the South Sudan Broadcasting Corporation were subsequently arrested on 7 January 2023 in relation to video of the urination, which was widely distributed online. The last of the journalists was eventually released on 16 March without charge.

=== Foreign policy ===
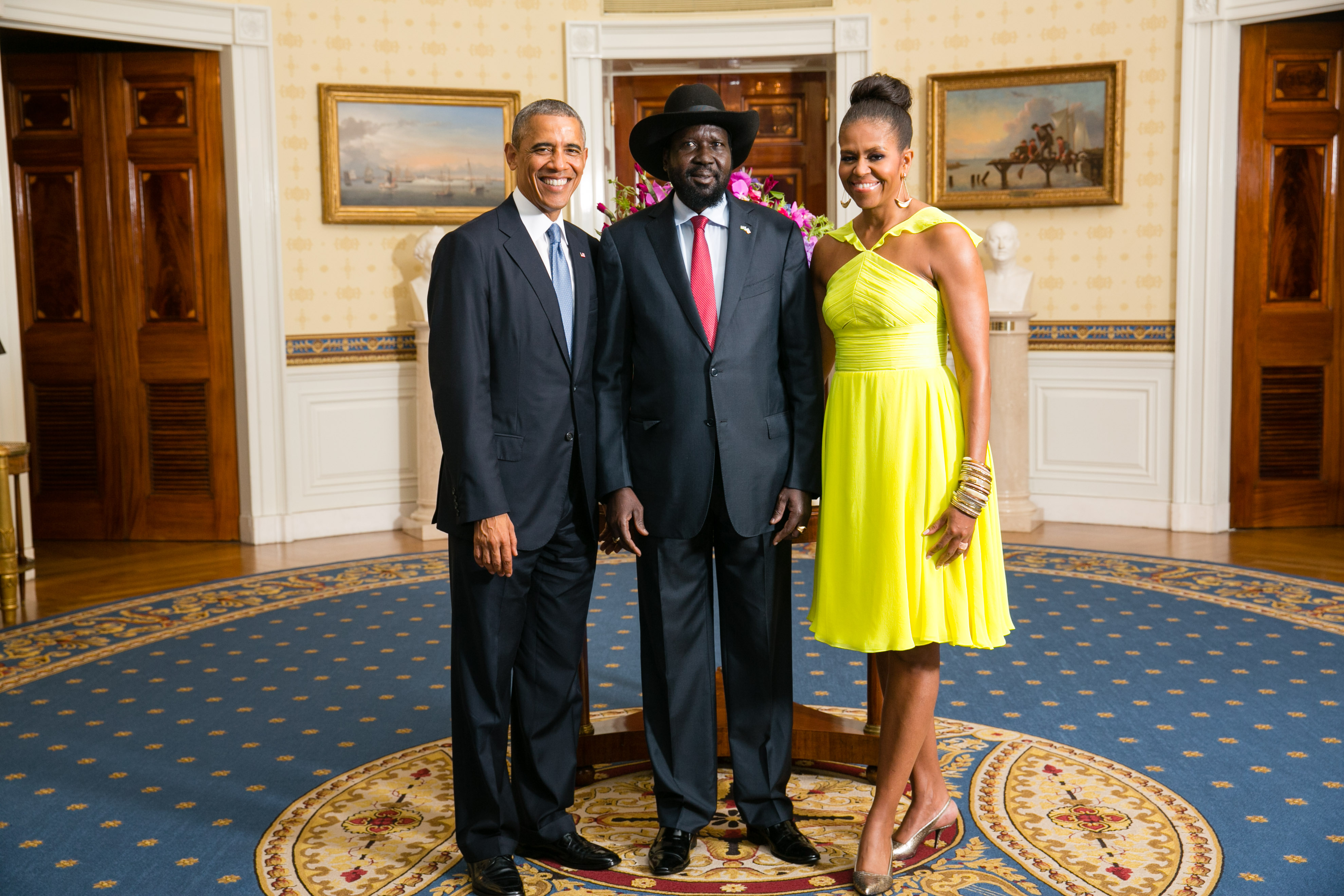
Kiir with US President Barack Obama in Washington, D.C., 5 August 2014

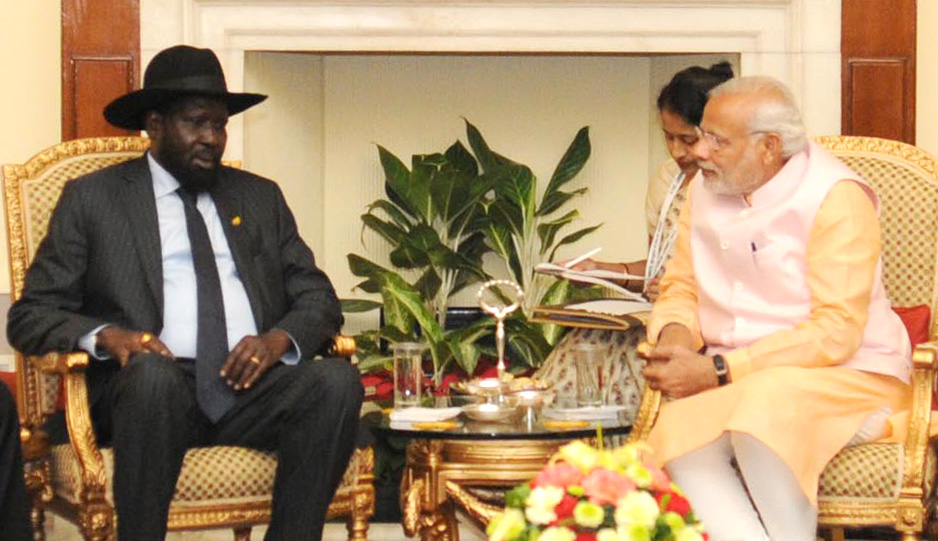
Kiir with Indian Prime Minister Narendra Modi, 30 October 2016

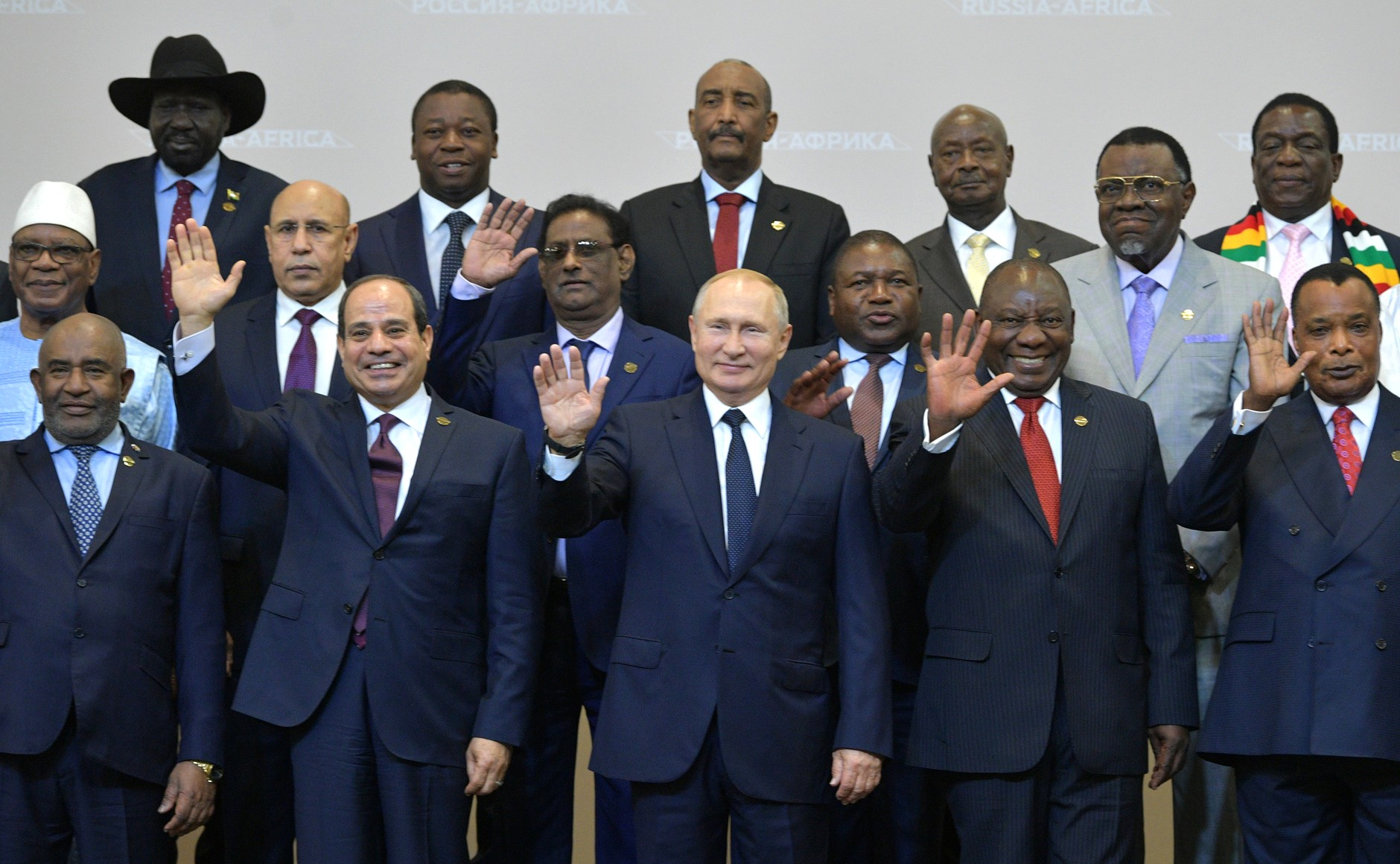
Kiir at the Russia–Africa Summit 2019 in Sochi on 24 October 2019

In mid-October 2011, Kiir announced South Sudan had applied for accession to the East African Community. He declared the East African Community to be "at the center of our hearts" due to its members' support of South Sudan during the Sudanese civil wars.

On 20 December 2011, Kiir visited Israel to thank it for its support during the First Sudanese Civil War from 1956 to 1972, and met with Israeli president Shimon Peres to discuss establishing an embassy in Jerusalem, which would make South Sudan the first country to have one in that city.

After the outbreak of the South Sudanese civil war, Salva Kiir delivered a speech in January 2014 lashing out at the United Nations and "so-called humanitarian organizations", accusing them of supporting Riek Machar to try to overthrow him. He accused the UN of sheltering his enemies on their bases adding, "There is a problem with the international community, and it is something that people will have to thrash out with them."

In March 2014, Kiir's government organized a rally accusing the United Nations of colluding with and arming anti-government forces.

Relations between Kiir's government and some erstwhile supporters deteriorated since the start of the civil war. He disclosed in an op-ed published in his name in the Washington Times in October 2015 that unnamed "international partners in peace" had threatened his government with sanctions, the withdrawal of aid support, and referrals to the International Criminal Court.

==== Heglig crisis and war with Sudan ====
On 26 March 2012, the South Sudanese army attacked the oilfield in the town of Heglig (known also to the Dinka of the Unity state as Panthou), located between the border of the Sudanese state of South Kordofan and the South Sudanese state of Unity, triggering the Heglig Crisis. On 27 September, Kiir met Sudanese President Omar al-Bashir and signed eight agreements in Addis Ababa, Ethiopia, which led the way to resume important oil exports and create a 10-kilometre (6 mi) demilitarized zone along their border. The agreements allow for the return of 56,000,000 litres (350,000 barrels) of South Sudanese oil to the world market. In addition, the agreements include an understanding of the parameters to follow in regards to demarcating their border, an economic cooperation agreement and a deal to protect each other's citizens. Certain issues remain unsolved and future talks are scheduled to resolve them.

On 25 November 2012, South Sudan launched a formal complaint to the United Nations Security Council (UNSC) against Sudan in the wake of aerial bombings carried out by the Sudan Armed Forces (SAF) in parts of South Sudan's northern Bahr el Ghazal state, killing at least eight people and injuring an equal number. South Sudan treated the attack as a gross violation of the cooperation agreement the two country's leaders signed in Addis Ababa, Ethiopia on 27 September.

=== Political crisis ===
In September 2013, an article appeared on the South Sudan News Agency website. The article was authored by a South Sudanese analyst and critical writer by the name Duop Chak Wuol. In his writings, Duop criticized the ruling SPLM party and warned of widespread consequences if the party doesn't fix its growing autocratic policies. Duop also predicted negative results the young nation would face if a civil war break out. Tensions rose between Kiir and his former vice president Riek Machar in December 2013 in the lead-up to a meeting of the National Liberation Council (NLC) of the ruling SPLM party. After two days of NLC meetings, on the night of 15 December 2013 shooting erupted within Salva Kiir's Presidential Guards. The next day, Kiir denounced Machar and other senior SPLM officials for staging a failed coup against his government, a claim later denied by Machar and others. These events marked the start of the South Sudanese Civil War. About 400,000 people were estimated to have been killed in the war by April 2018, including notable atrocities such as the 2014 Bentiu massacre.

=== Assassination plot ===
According to a Saudi Arabian diplomatic cable released by WikiLeaks in June 2015, the Saudi Arabian embassy in Khartoum had previously alerted the Saudi Arabian government of an assassination plot against Kiir by members of the Egyptian and Sudanese intelligence agencies.

=== Business interests ===
Kiir is reported to be the part-owner of ABMC Thai-South Sudan Construction Company Limited with Garang Deng Aguer and Benjamin Bol Mel. According to a report by Radio Tamazuj, however, Kiir's shares are not held directly but may be concealed in the name of a close associate. Ties between Kiir and the company were denied by Kiir's spokesman Ateny Wek. The company was awarded at least $161 million in government roads contracts. The president's wife previously held shares in Yanyyom Mineral Water and Beverage Factory located in Juba. The factory took its name from Lake Yanyyom, located near the president's hometown Akon in Warrap State. Another owner of the factory was Garang Deng Aguer, a business magnate and former Governor of Northern Bahr el Ghazal State.

=== South Sudan famine ===
In the early months of 2017, parts of South Sudan experienced a famine following several years of instability in the country's food supply caused by civil war and drought. International humanitarian advocates stated the famine was man-made and pointed to the country's ongoing conflict for creating the famine conditions. More than 3 million people had been displaced by ongoing violence across the country, forcing families to abandon agricultural land and livestock, leaving them with few food resources to survive with. The worst fighting was in Unity State, where tens of thousands of people fled their homes due to a government offensive against opposition-held areas.

Days after the declaration of famine, the government raised the price of a business visa from $100 to $10,000, mostly aimed at aid workers, citing a need to increase government revenue. U.N. officials said that Kiir was blocking food deliveries to some areas.

== Personal life ==
=== Stetson hat ===
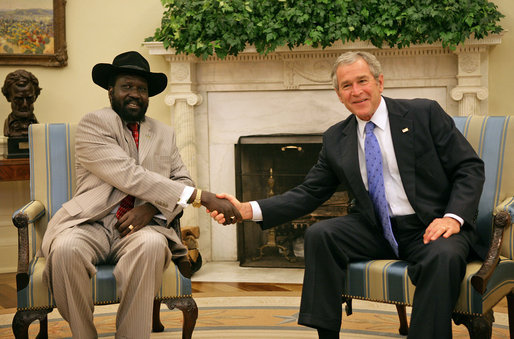
Kiir with United States President George W. Bush, 15 November 2007

In 2006, when visiting the White House, Kiir received a black stetson as a gift from U.S. President George W. Bush. He reportedly liked it so much that he purchased several. He now rarely makes public appearances without wearing one.

=== Marriage controversy ===
In a politically charged social issue, it has been claimed that Kiir secretly married the daughter of former comrade, the late William Nyuon Bany, an ethnic Nuer and former leader of the SPLA. Allegedly, a traditional Dinka ceremony was conducted by his brothers. This led to strife between Kiir's eldest daughter and Aluel William Nyuon Bany. Kiir has not publicly commented on the allegation. According to media reports in Kenya, "Kiir's in-laws" have requested privacy.

=== Religion ===
Kiir is Catholic.

== Notes ==
Political offices
New office	Vice President of Southern Sudan; 2005	Succeeded by Riek Machar
Preceded by John Garang	President of Southern Sudan; 2005–2011	Position abolished
Preceded by John Garang	First Vice President of Sudan; 2005–2011	Succeeded by Ali Osman Taha
New office	President of South Sudan; 2011–present	Incumbent
