= Minimum wage in Sudan =

The minimum wage in Sudan is LS 425 per month (US$0.95 as of August 2021). It is LS 3,000 (US$6.72 as of 2021) per month for civil servants.

== History ==
Until late 1974, when the Minimum Standard of Wages Order (Presidential Order no. 21) was issued, there had not been a minimum wage in the private sector, although in a few occupations, such as stevedoring at Port Sudan, official wage orders had set certain minimums. The 1974 minimum, established at LS 6.50 a month, was equivalent to the minimum entry wage for public-sector jobs. It applied, however, basically only to workers in establishments having 10 or more employees in the Khartoum area, Al-Gezira, and certain other urban centers. Its geographical limitations together with important exemptions—employees below the age of 18, all those in enterprises having fewer than 10 workers, seasonal agricultural workers, and some others—excluded about three-quarters of all wage earners.

The minimum wage was established by a commission consisting of specialized members representing the state, workers, and employers, and enforced by the Ministry of Labour. Workers denied the minimum wage could file a grievance with their local Ministry of Labor field office. In April 2004, the Ministry of Labour and Administrative Reform, the Sudanese Businessmen and Employers Federation, and the Sudan Workers’ Trade Union Federation (SWTUF) agreed to raise the minimum wage to SD 12,500 (US$48 at the time) per month. By 2011 it had increased to LS 265 (US$99 as of 2011) per month. In 2013, the minimum wage was increased to LS 425 per month (US$96 as of January 2013). Since this minimum wage increase, there has been dramatic inflation in Sudan, reducing the value of the minimum wage (US$0.95 as of August 2021).

== See also ==
- 1997 Labour Code
