= Stephen Dhieu Dau =

South Sudanese politician (born 1963)

Honorable Stephen Dhieu Dau
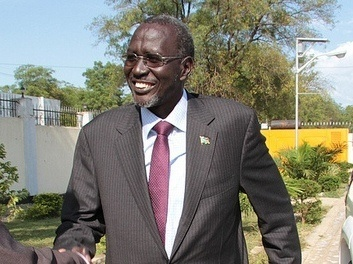

4th Minister of Finance and Planning
- In office July 2016 – March 2018
- President: Salva Kiir
- Preceded by: David Deng Athorbei
- Succeeded by: Salvatore Garang Mabiordit

1st Minister of Petroleum and Mining
- In office August 2011 – April 2016
- President: Salva Kiir
- Preceded by: Position Established
- Succeeded by: Dak Diop Bichok

Personal details
- Born: 1963 (age 62–63) Melut County, Upper Nile State, South Sudan
- Party: SPLM
- Education: Bachelor of Commerce; Cairo University, Cairo, Egypt; Masters of Financial and Banking Studies; Sudan University of Science and Technology, Khartoum, Sudan
- Occupation: Banker and Economist

Stephen Dhieu Dau Ayik is a South Sudanese politician, banker by profession, and financial technocrat. He is a proven professional and held various cabinet positions in the Government of the Republic of South Sudan. He is a senior member of Sudan’s People Liberation Movement (SPLM) and had served in various cabinet positions. Stephen Dhieu Dau was the Minister of Finance and Planning until March 2018 in the RSS. He served as Minister of Petroleum and Mining and Minister of Commerce and Industry. Stephen Dhieu Dau is from Melut County, Upper Nile State, and belongs to the Nyiel section of the Padang Dinka ethnic group. In October 2022, President Salva Kiir appointed Stephen Dhieu Dau as the chairperson of the Board of Directors of the National Revenue Authority. In December 2022, He was appointed as a member of the SPLM Political Bureau.

== Biography ==
Stephen Dhieu Dau Ayik was born in Melut County, Upper Nile State. Stephen Dhieu attended Renk Secondary School and went to Cairo University - Egypt, where he graduated with a bachelor's degree of commerce. During his studies years (1986 - 1990) at the university, he was very active student in academic, political and cultural activities in the students’ community. He was the Chief Editor of the Voice of South Sudan newspaper, was being issued by South Sudan Students Association in Egypt ( SOSSA). As the Chief Editor, he wrote extensively about political, cultural and social issues facing Sudanese people and Southern Sudanese in particularly, in the time of war that broke out in 1980s between the North and the South, specifically, the problem of national identity, the issue of religion and state and how govern a United Sudan. His writings garnered popularity among the Sudanese and Southern Sudanese living in Egypt.

In 1991, Stephen Dhieu began his professional career at the Central Bank of Sudan (CBOS), formerly known, as Bank of Sudan (BoS) till the CPA era, working his way in banking profession to the senior positions’ roles in the banking control and financing dept. and foreign exchange and external relations dept. While working for the bank, he obtained a Post Graduate Diploma in Banking from the Higher Institute of Financial and Banking Studies in Khartoum and a master's degree in Financial and Banking Studies, from Business School, Sudan University of Science and Technology in 2005. His thesis was on examining the causes of bank insolvency.

In 2006, he was appointed to the Technical Assessment and Conversion Committee, responsible for designing, processing and overseeing the change of the Sudanese currency from dinars (SD) to pounds (SDG). He was among the internal cells within Sudan, govern controlled areas who provided technical supporting to the Sudan People’s Liberation Movement (SPLM) negotiating team on wealth sharing protocol during the peace talks in Naivasha, Kenya, during the Comprehensive Peace Agreement (CPA) negotiations, the contribution that led to establishment of the two windows in banking industry in Sudan, the Islamic banking system in the North and the conventional banking system in the South, during the six years period of the CPA - 2005 to 2011. More as one of the few SPLM members working in the Central Bank, he was a member in the joint committees between Sudan and South Sudan, of prior and post CPA issues.

== Government of Southern Sudan ==
In May 2007, Stephen Dhieu Dau was appointed as the Minister of Finance, Trade, and Economic Planning of the oil-rich Upper Nile state. As the state minister, he had overseen robust public finance management and economic development. Stephen Dhieu played a critical role during the 2010 elections. He was the Campaign Manager for President Salva Kiir, and the SPLM party in Upper Nile state. The SPLM won a slide victory in general elections in 2010 in Upper Nile state, at all three levels of the government ( national in Khartoum, subnational in Juba and state), including gubernatorial position, and over 90% seat in all legislative assemblies.

In 2010, upon general elections, Stephen Dhieu Dau, was appointed as the Minister of Commerce and Industry in the Government of Southern Sudan ( GoSS). As the Minister, he was responsible for formulation of policy, laws and regulations of trade and industry, promoting trade and reviving the defunct industrial schemes across Southern Sudan.

== Government of the Republic of South Sudan ==
Following the independence of South Sudan on July 9, 2011, as South Sudan (RSS) became a, Republic, sovereign and independent country, he was appointed Caretaker Minister of Commerce and Industry from July 9. 2011 - August 25. 2011 pending the appointment of the first Cabinet of the newest Republic of South Sudan.

On August 26, 2011, Stephen Dhieu Dau was appointed as the first Minister of Petroleum and Mining and tasked with overseeing the development of the oil and gas, formalization and harmonization of laws, agreements governing the petroleum industry, imposition of sovereign powers on the oil sector and the transition of management of the oil sector from the Republic of Sudan to the Republic of South Sudan, successfully he managed to overtake the petroleum management. As the Minister of Petroleum and Mining, he developed legislation to regulate petroleum and mining activities in South Sudan, pushed for the employment of thousands of South Sudanese nationals in the oil sector, through South Sudanization program.

In August 2013, he was reappointed as the Minister of Petroleum and Mining (MPM), which he held until April 2016. In April 2016, he was appointed as the Minister of Trade and Industry. Then in July 2016, he was appointed as the Minister of Finance and Planning.

As the Minister of Finance and Planning, he pushed for vital fiscal reforms, robust public financial management, enforcing tough fiscal and monetary policies, strengthening cooperation with the International Monetary Fund (IMF) and The World Bank Group ( WB) in the quest for revitalization of the economy of South Sudan. He reached out to international and regional financial institutions, resulted in attracting technical and financial support to South Sudan, concluding in membership in the Africa Export and Import Bank (EXIM Bank) in 2017 in Cairo - Egypt and the Southern and Eastern Africa Trade and Development Bank (TDB) in Nairobi- Kenya in 2017. Hon. Stephen Dhieu served as the Minister of Finance and Planning until March 2018.

== Photos ==
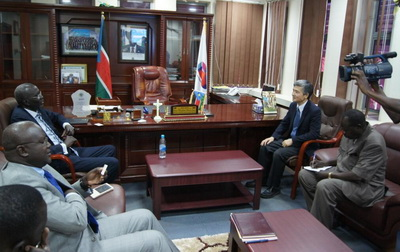
Hon. Stephen Dhieu Dau meeting with Chinese Ambassador to South Sudan at the Ministry of Finance and Planning in 2017

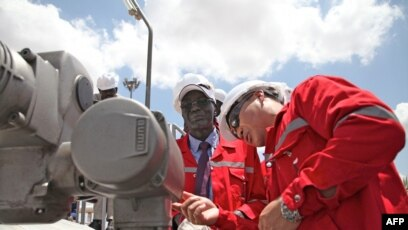
Hon. Stephen Dhieu Dau visiting South Sudan oilfields during his capacity as Minister of Petroleum and Mining.

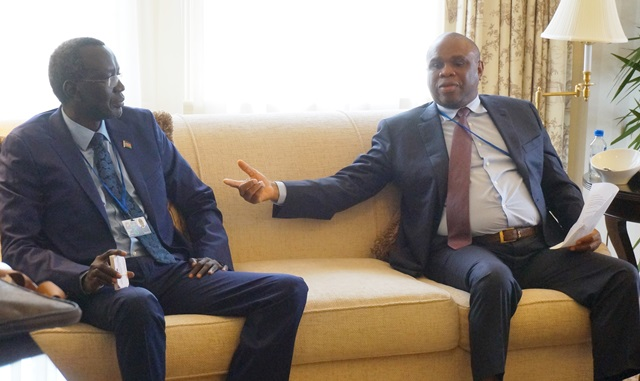
Hon. Stephen Dhieu meeting with Afreximbank President Dr. Benedict Oramah after finalizing South Sudan's membership into the bank in 2017.

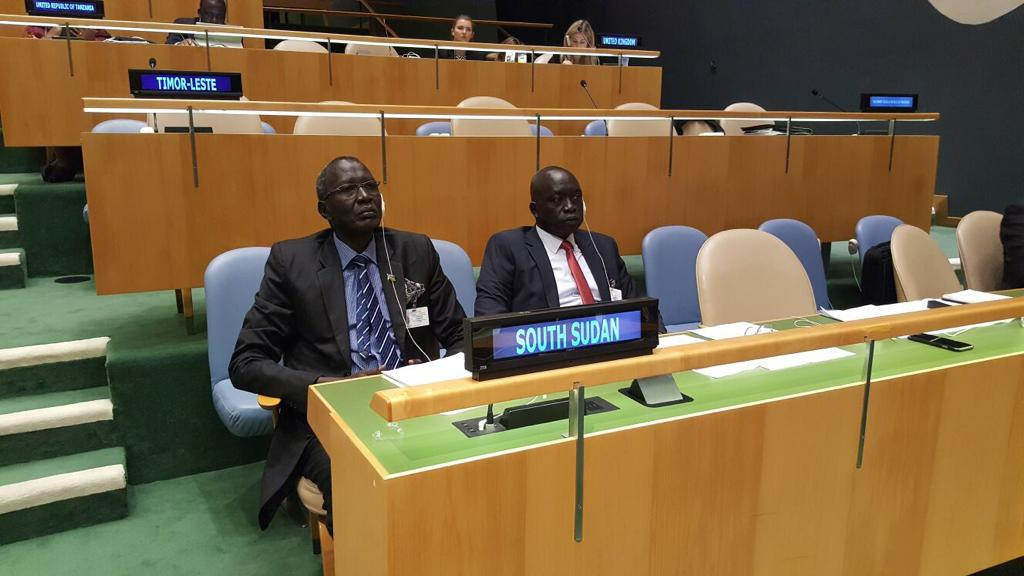
Hon. Stephen Dhieu Dau (left) and Hon. Hussein Maar (then Minister of Humanitarian Affairs) at the 2016 UN General Assembly in New York City.

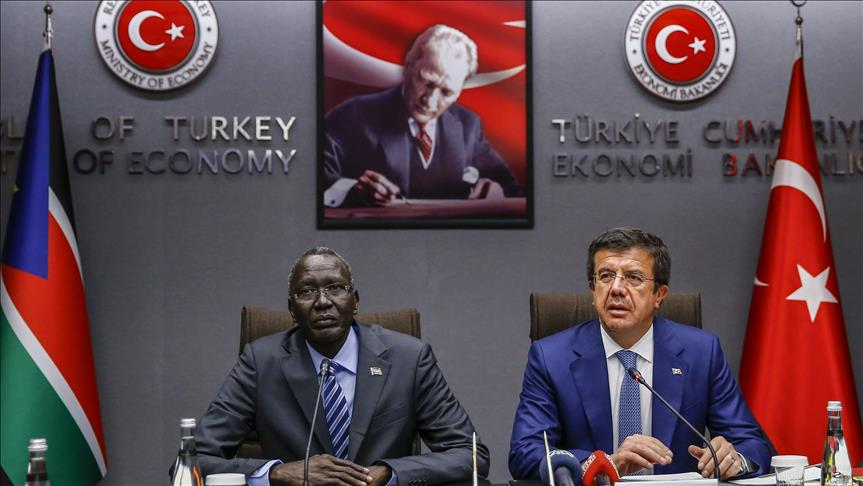
Hon. Stephen Dhieu and Turkish Economy Minister Nihiat Zeybekci in Ankara at a signing ceremony for economic cooperation between South Sudan and Turkey in April 2017.

== See also ==
- Government of the Republic of South Sudan
- Sudan People's Liberation Movement (SPLM)
- Ministry of Petroleum and Mining
- Salva Kiir
- South Sudan
- Melut County
- Upper Nile State
