= Elijah Malok Aleng =

Former Central Bank Governor of South Sudan

Elijah Malok Aleng (28 November 1937 – 30 October 2014, Nairobi, Kenya) was a South Sudanese public servant, general, and politician, from [Twic Dinka/Twi East county] in Jonglei State. He was born on 28 November 1937 at Thianwong village when his family was living among the Pen people in Angakuei in Baidit, about 20 miles northeast of Bor town. His family, which is originally from Awulian in Wangulei, Twic East County, migrated back to be with fellow Awulian kinfolks. He attended Malek Primary School (1950–1953), and then Juba Intermediate School and Juba Commercial Senior Secondary School, graduating He then attended Free University of the Congo, in the present Democratic Republic of Congo (DRC), and later got a scholarship to study in Fribourg Catholic University, Switzerland, from which he obtained a master's degree in economics in 1972. In 1975 he obtained another Masters in Development Studies and Economic Planning from Wolfson College, Cambridge in the United Kingdom. In his memoirs: the Southern Sudan: Struggle for Liberty, named Chief Deng Biar Abit, leader of the Awulian clan, Paul Logali, former finance minister of Southern Sudan regional government and Akec Kwai Biar, former Bor District Commissioner and his cousin as the people who positively influenced him.

He was elected a Member of Parliament (MP) representing Bor North territorial constituency in the regional parliament of Sudan in May 1982.

== Early career ==
He enrolled in the Sudan People's Liberation Movement/Army (SPLM/SPLA) on 28 December 1983 and became active in its ranks. He started as one of the senior political commissars in June 1984, and then he went to join the Cadet Military College, graduating with the rank of a Major. He was posted in Southern Blue Nile front, where he was the second in command after the late A/Cdr Wilson Kur Chol. The Sudan People's Liberation Army (SPLA) forces of Eagle Battalion, which they were commanding, were largely made up of Dinka elements from Northern Bahr el Ghazal specifically from Abiei, Gogrial and Aweil Counties. He remained in Southern Blue Nile front until mid-1987 when he was accredited to francophone West Africa as a special envoy of the movement. He was the SPLM Resident Representative in the People's Republic of the Congo, with non-residential representation in Zaire (now DRC), Gabon, Cameroon, Central African Republic (CAR), Rwanda, Burundi and Chad. He was primarily stationed in Brazzaville, Congo, but travelled from time to time in the various capitals.

== Positions and roles in Africa ==
He remained in Francophone Africa until the advent of multi-party democracy in 1991. In June 1991, he was appointed executive director of the SRRA where he remained until January 1993, when he was transferred and became the spokesman of the SPLM in East Africa, a duty he carried out for the whole of 1993. In January 1994, he was appointed Secretary of the national Convention Organising Committee (COC), which organized the First SPLM/A National Convention. The convention was successfully held in Chukudum, New Sudan, in April/May 1994. After this convention, such SPLM structures as the General Military Council (GMC), National Liberation Council (NLC) and National Executive Council (NEC) were instituted. He was elected member of NLC representing Bor North territorial constituency and he also became a member and Secretary of the First NEC in the portfolio of Co-ordination and Public Service. In 1997, he has reshuffled away from public service and coordination to an advisory role in the Office of chairman and C-in-C of the SPLM/SPLA. In that capacity, he became the advisor on economic, financial and political affairs. In February 1999, he was again appointed, for the second time, the executive director of the SRRA and ex-officio member of the NEC on humanitarian affairs in New Sudan. When peace negotiations began between various Sudan governments and the SPLM between 1985 and 2005, he was always the Secretary of the SPLM to the Peace Talks continuing until the CPA was signed in January 2005. In 2005 he was appointed Deputy Governor of the Central Bank of Sudan (CBOS) and President of the Bank of Southern Sudan (BOSS).

== Post-South Sudan independence ==
After the independence of South Sudan on 9 July 2011, he became the de facto Governor of the Bank of South Sudan (BSS) until he was dismissed by President Salva Kiir and replaced by his deputy Kornelius Koryom Mayiik in August 2011. He introduced the South Sudanese pound, the country's first currency ]. He co-signed the historic currency with the then Minister of Finance, Deng Athorbei. As a governor, he tried his best to fight corruption and misuse of public funds .

He was still within the ranks of Sudan People Liberation Army (SPLA) with the rank of a lieutenant general until dying on 30 October 2014.

He wrote a book Southern Sudan Struggle for Liberty published by the East Africa Publishers in 2009.
