= Politics of South Sudan =

The politics of South Sudan concern the system of government in the Republic of South Sudan, a country in East Africa, and the people, organizations, and events involved in it.

As a region, the Republic of South Sudan gained autonomy in 2005 with former rebel leader Dr. John Garang becoming the President of New Sudan and the Vice President of Sudan. Garang's death in 2005 led to Salva Kiir taking over as president and Riek Machar as the vice president. Full independence from the Republic of Sudan was gained, following a referendum in 2011.

== Eruption of the Civil War ==
When Kiir sacked his entire cabinet in 2013, Riek Machar accused him of stepping towards a dictatorship and challenged him for Presidency, triggering a civil war.

In September 2018, a Revitalized Agreement on the Resolution of the Conflict in the Republic of South Sudan (A-RCSS) was signed, resulting to formation of the Revitalized Transitional Government of National Unity (R-TGoNU) initially for 24 months, was extended in August 2022.

== History ==
Prior to autonomy and eventual independence, Southern Sudan was a region of the Republic of Sudan, which had achieved independence from the co-rule of Great Britain and Egypt in 1956. Sudan had been divided culturally and ethnically between the majority-Muslim Arab north and the majority-Christian Nilotic south. Southern leaders and members of the Sudan Defense Force cited oppression of the North as reason for growing tensions between the two regions. This led to the formation of the Separatist Anyanya rebel army, who sought regional autonomy. The First Sudanese Civil War was a 16-year conflict between the Anyanya and the Sudan People's Armed Forces.

The war ended with the signing of the 1972 Addis Ababa Agreement which granted autonomy to the Southern region of Sudan. After an 11-year period of resolution, then president Gaafar Nimeiry declared all of Sudan, including the autonomous Southern region, to be an Islamic state. This declaration ended the Addis Ababa Agreement and removed autonomy from Southern Sudan, sparking the Second Sudanese Civil War from 1983 to 2005.

After the signing of the Comprehensive Peace Agreement (also known as the Naivasha Agreement) between the government of Sudan and the rebel Sudan People's Liberation Army, Southern Sudan regained its status as an autonomous region of the Republic of Sudan from 2005 to 2011, when South Sudan gained independence.

On 9 January 2005, the Government of Southern Sudan was established after the signing of the Comprehensive Peace Agreement (CPA). John Garang, the former rebel leader of the Sudan People's Liberation Army/Movement, became President of the Government of Southern Sudan and Vice President of Sudan. A constitution was adopted in December 2005.

In July 2005, Garang died in a helicopter crash in Uganda, and was succeeded in both posts by Salva Kiir, with Riek Machar as Vice-President of Southern Sudan.

=== 2011 Southern Sudanese independence referendum ===
The voting form (ballot) used in the referendum.

Flag of the Republic of South Sudan

A referendum on independence for Southern Sudan was held from 9 to 15 January 2011.

Voting on the referendum began on 9 January 2011. On January 12, after three days of voting, representatives of the Sudan People's Liberation Movement (SPLM) announced that, according to their estimates, 60 percent turnout threshold required for the referendum's validity (corresponding to around 2.3 million voters) had been reached. Official confirmation later the same day indicates that, when the referendum commission released a statement announcing that turnout would "exceed" the required 60 percent threshold.

Mohamed Ibrahim Khalil, chairman of the referendum commission, said 83 percent of eligible voters in the south and 53 percent in the north had voted. Over 90% of those who voted supported independence, which was officially granted on July 9. Salva Kiir was appointed as South Sudan's first President, and Riek Machar was appointed as South Sudan's first Vice-president.

=== 2013–2014 civil war and reform ===
In July 2013, Kiir dismissed all his Ministers, including Vice President Riek Machar, with the official aim of reducing the size of government. However, Riek Machar said it was a step towards dictatorship and that he would challenge Salva Kiir for the presidency.

On 14–15 December 2013, an attempted coup d'état was put down. Intermittent fighting then continued amid ceasefire breakdowns during the ensuing civil war and international concern grew over more than 1,000 deaths, a humanitarian catastrophe of over a million refugees, and man-made famine. In the meantime, the Sudan People's Liberation Movement (SPLM) factionalized into the SPLM-Juba led by President Salva Kiir and the SPLM-IO led by former Vice President Riek Machar. Kiir told the sixty-ninth session of the United Nations General Assembly that Machar was to blame for the conflict. Amidst a party power struggle, the government was blamed by Pagan Amum for not allowing the unarmed opposition group Political Parties Leadership Forum and its leader Lam Akol from taking part in the negotiations. Kiir also dismissed his ethnic colleague Rebecca Garang, widow of the SPLM's founder John Garang, in August alleging her criticism made her anti-government. Relations with China, South Sudan's largest foreign investor, and Uganda also improved after the SPLM-IO visited Beijing and opened a liaison office in Kampala and accepted an Ugandan troop presence in Juba, in a move away from criticising Uganda's initial support for the government.

Following sanctions against some of the leadership on both sides, including an arms embargo that was unknowingly violated by China's NORINCO until the sales were then canceled by the government who called for an end to hostilities, an IGAD-mediated resolution in Bahir Dar, Ethiopia under U.S.-led international pressure was finally agreed at the end of September 2014 that would institute federalisation in the country, a move that even less involved regional leaders in the country had suggested but the government had initially rejected. The talks were led by Nhial Deng Nhial and Deng Alor for the government and rebels, respectively. The rebels' lead negotiator was then due to be replaced by Taban Deng Gai. At the same time, the government expressed optimism at the resolution.

Both sides then agreed to the government's 30-month proposal for rule by a national unity government but discussions continued over the authority of the prime minister in the interim period. While the interim period was agreed, the pre-transitional period was still in dispute with the government wanting three months and the rebels asking for a month. SPLM-IO's Taban Deng said the negotiations were suspended, while the government's Michael Makuei confirmed this adding that it would resume on 16 October with the prime ministerial issue being referred to an IGAD heads of state summit for discussion. Foreign Minister Barnaba Marial Benjamin criticised the rebels for allegedly not signing the protocol but also said of the break:

What has happened is that the negotiators have been asked to go back to their principals to consult on some of the issues where there is some concurrence. Some people seemed to agree on certain points. So they have to go back and consult with the principals. The interim government will be formed once you have a political solution. There must be a political agreement so that you have an interim government to implement what has been agreed upon. In principle that has been accepted by the government."

It also followed IGAD giving the groups 45 days from August to work out a transition agreement.

Fighting continued in end-October in Unity with expectations for fighting in Upper Nile, with both sides blaming each other; The Guardian claiming preparations were being undertaken for further fighting. At fighting near the compound of the United Nations in Juba, dozens of civilians were reported injured by UNMISS.

In mid-November, despite an agreement to unconditionally end the fighting, hostilities took place in three provinces with each side blaming each other. Further, the government rejected a proposal to abolish the post of vice president and replace it with a prime minister. Cabinet Affairs Minister Martin Elia Lomuro said: "The government delegation did not receive such proposal from IGAD. We only read it from the media reports attributing statements carrying such suggestions to the rebels, and I don't I understand the basis of the proposal."

==== Federalization ====
The resolution, as announced by Intergovernmental Authority for Development (IGAD) entailed structures and functions of a Transitional National unity government that was "mostly agreed on." However, the "in principle" breakthrough after months of discussions on instituting a federalised structure of government was held up by the time frame for implementation. The Sudan People's Liberation Movement-In Opposition (SPLM-IO ) called for immediate implementation, while the governing SPLM-Juba asked for a 30-month transitional period prior to the formation of a new administration. This would entail bypassing the scheduled 2015 election.

As part of the ceasefire agreement following the end of the South Sudanese Civil War, South Sudan began a transition towards federalism, overseen by Lasuba L. Wango, the Minister of Federal Affairs since 2020.

=== 2020 onwards, Unity Government ===
To bring peace to South Sudan, President Salva Kiir and his former rival, Riek Machar formed a Unity Government in February 2020. The two-year deal included uniting their two armies, an act that by August 2022 had not yet occurred. The deal was due to expire on 22 February 2023, with a general election expected to follow, but in August 2022 the deal was extended and elections delayed until December 2024.

== Constitution ==
The Transitional Constitution of South Sudan (TCSS) was drafted in 2011 as a temporary document in place of a permanent constitution. It is the constitution of South Sudan until a permanent constitution is ratified. Because of the transitional nature of the TCSS, it favors a decentralized governmental system. Prior to the 2011 independence referendum, the Interim Constitution of South Sudan was the constitution of the then-autonomous Southern Sudan.

The National Legislature of South Sudan, the country's legislative body, is composed of the National Legislative Assembly and the Council of States.

The executive branch of government is headed by the president. Under the TCSS, the president's term lasts for two consecutive 5-year terms. However, in April 2015, South Sudan's parliament voted to extend Kiir's term to 9 July 2018. A new vote held in July 2018 further postponed South Sudan's first election until 2021. The president has vast powers in creating and dissolving state powers during times of emergency. Kiir demonstrated this power in the dismissal of his entire cabinet in 2013.

== Ministries ==
South Sudan's President Salva Kiir has named cabinet ministers, sharing power with ex-rebels in a key step in the peace process.

Kiir nominated 20 ministers, while SPLM-IO's Riek Machar nominated nine ministers. The South Sudan Opposition Alliance (SSOA) nominated three ministers, Former detainees nominated two ministers and other opposition political parties nominated one minister.

The new Transitional Government of National Unity (TGoNU) is part of a peace agreement signed in September 2018 between President Kiir and several opposition leaders including Riek Machar, the new First Vice President.

1. Ministry of Cabinet Affairs
2. Ministry of Foreign Affairs and International Cooperation
3. Ministry of Defense and Veterans’ Affairs
4. Ministry of Interior
5. Ministry of Peace Building
6. Ministry of Justice and Constitutional Affairs
7. Ministry of National Security
8. Ministry of Parliamentary Affairs
9. Ministry of Information, Communication, Technology and Postal Services
10. Ministry of Federal Affairs
11. Ministry of East African Community Affairs
12. Ministry of Finance and Economic Planning
13. Ministry of Petroleum
14. Ministry of Mining
15. Ministry of Agriculture and Food Security
16. Ministry of Livestock and Fisheries
17. Ministry of Trade and Industry
18. Ministry of Environment and Forestry
19. Ministry of Water Resources and Irrigation
20. Ministry of Lands, Housing and Urban Development
21. Ministry of Wildlife, Conservation and Tourism
22. Ministry of Investment
23. Ministry of Higher Education
24. Ministry of General Education and Instruction
25. Ministry of Health
26. Ministry of Public Service and Human Resource Development
27. Ministry of Labour, Public Service and Human Resource Development
28. Ministry of Energy and Dams
29. Ministry of Transport
30. Ministry of Roads and Bridges
31. Ministry of Gender and Social Welfare
32. Ministry of Humanitarian Affairs
33. Ministry of Culture, Museums and National Heritage
34. Ministry of Youth and Sports

== Notable people ==
- Isaac Awan Maper, politician, Minister for the Environment
- Kosti Manubi, Minister for Cabinet Affairs
- Luka Tombekana Monoja, Minister of Health

== See also ==
- List of presidents of South Sudan
- List of vice-presidents of South Sudan
- Samson L. Kwaje
