= Ministry of Finance and Economic Planning =

Ministry of Finance and Economic Planning may refer to:

- Ministry of Finance and Economic Planning (Ghana)
- Ministry of Finance and Economic Planning (Rwanda)
- Ministry of Finance and Economic Planning (South Sudan)
