= Dier Tong Ngor =

South Sudanese Minister of Finance and Economic Planning

Minister of Finance
- In office 4 August 2022 – 3 August 2023
- President: Salva Kiir
- Preceded by: Agak Achuil Lual
- Succeeded by: Barnaba Bak Chol

Governor of the Bank of South Sudan
- In office November 2020 – January 2022
- Preceded by: Gamal Abdalla Wani
- Succeeded by: Moses Makur Deng

Personal details
- Born: 1974 (age 51–52) Upper Nile State
- Education: University of Khartoum

Dier Tong Ngor is a South Sudanese politician who served as the Minister of Finance and Planning from 4 August 2022 to August 2023.

He graduated from University of Khartoum in 1986 with an honour degree in business administration, majoring in finance. He had an outstanding career in banking industry starting in 1986 when he was appointed as an inspection officer in Central Bank of Sudan. He also holds Master in Business Administration (MBA) from University College Dublin and a PhD in Finance from Walden University.

He was the governor of the Bank of South Sudan twice: from May 2018 to January 2020 and from November 2020 to January 2022.

He is a career central banker. He started his career with the Central Bank of Sudan and the Bank of South Sudan (central bank) where he held positions of Director General of Banking Supervision & Research, and Director General of Banking Operations. He was also appointed in 2017 as First Deputy Governor for Policy & Banking and subsequently served twice as the Governor of the Bank of South Sudan up to January 2022. He is credited with successful reforms of the exchange rate in South Sudan, which resulted in the unification of exchange rates in the country in 2021.
