= Trade unions in South Sudan =

- National organization(s): SSTUWF
- Regulatory authority: Ministry of Labour, Public Service and Human Resource Development
- Primary legislation: Workers Trade Unions Act, 2013

Global Rights Index
- 5+ No guarantee of rights due to breakdown of law

International Labour Organization
- South Sudan is a member of the ILO

Convention ratification
- Freedom of Association: Not ratified
- Right to Organise: 29 April 2012

Trade unions in South Sudan first emerged in the period prior to the country's independence with the formation of the Southern Sudan Workers Trade Union in August 2010.

== List of unions in South Sudan ==
- Employers Association of South Sudan (EASS)
- South Sudan Workers Trade Union Federation (SSWTUF)
- South Sudan Women Union (SSWU)

== Trade union rights ==
The situation of trade unions rights in South Sudan is currently classified as one of the worst in the world, with a complete breakdown in the rule of law. In 2019, the, President of the South Sudan Workers Trade Union Federation (SSWTUF), Simone Deng, was murdered while on a trade union mission.
