= Inflation in Sudan =

In economics, inflation is an increase in the general price level of goods and services in an economy. Inflation has been a significant problem for the economy of Sudan recent years.

== History ==
During the 1970s, the government of Sudan compiled monthly data on consumer prices, based on data collected in the capital area's three cities, Omdurman, Khartoum, and Khartoum North. At the beginning of the 1970s, annual inflation was moderate, between 9 and 10 percent. From 1973 onward, the inflation rate grew because of continuing worldwide inflation, an increase in the money supply resulting from the central government's deficit financing and from borrowing by state corporations, shortages of consumer goods, problems of supply caused by transport deficiencies, and increased private-sector borrowing. By 1989 prices were increasing by 74 percent annually.

Inflationary pressures continued into the 1990s. Prices increased by more than 100 percent a year during 1991–94, with the rate reaching a high of 130 percent in 1996. Implementation of the International Monetary Fund reform program in 1997, along with monetary reforms of the central bank and declining prices of imported non-oil commodities and manufactured goods, slowed inflation to less than 47 percent in that year, less than 20 percent in 1998 and 1999, and to single digits by 2000. Inflation was 7.2 percent in 2006. Although other countries in the region experienced recession-led declines in inflation in 2009, a surge in prices in the final months of that year pushed the rate of inflation in Sudan to an annual average of 11.2 percent and to 13 percent in 2010.

== Recent developments ==
Between 2011 and 2017, inflation rates ranged between approximately 17% and 44%.

As of mid-2018, the inflation rate reached 64%—the third highest in the world after South Sudan and Venezuela—as Sudan experienced an economic crisis. In 2020, inflation rates reached a record high of 212%.
