= List of strikes in Sudan =

Throughout the history of Sudan, a number of strikes, labour disputes, student strikes, hunger strikes, and other industrial actions have occurred.

== Background ==
A labour strike is a work stoppage caused by the mass refusal of employees to work. This can include wildcat strikes, which are done without union authorisation, and slowdown strikes, where workers reduce their productivity while still carrying out minimal working duties. It is usually a response to employee grievances, such as low pay or poor working conditions. Strikes can also occur to demonstrate solidarity with workers in other workplaces or pressure governments to change policies.

== 20th century ==
=== 1940s ===
- 1947 Sudan rail strike, by rail workers in Anglo-Egyptian Sudan demanding that the Workers' Affairs Association be recognised as their union.
- 1947 Southern Sudan strike

=== 1950s ===
- 1950 Sudan general strike
- 1951 Khartoum police strike
- 1955 Sudanese rail strike

=== 1960s ===
- October 1964 Revolution

=== 1970s ===
- 1973 Sudanese student protests, including strikes, resulting in the Sudanese government declaring a state of emergency.

=== 1980s ===
- 1981 Sudanese rail strike
- 1983 Sudanese judicial strike, strike by judges and lawyers.
- Strike by Sudan Airways workers calling for security guarantees following the 1986 Sudan Airways Fokker F-27 shootdown.
- 1987 Sudanese customs duty officers' strike
- 1989 Sudanese doctors' strike, strike by doctors, represented by the Sudanese Medical Association, after the Revolutionary Command Council for National Salvation fired 90 doctors for alleged anti-government activities.

=== 1990s ===
- 1990 University of Gezira strike, student strike at the University of Gezira after eight professors were fired by the Revolutionary Command Council for National Salvation.

== 21st century ==
=== 2010s ===
- 2019–2022 Sudanese protests

== See also ==
- Trade unions in Sudan
