= Bank of South Sudan =

Monetary authority of South Sudan

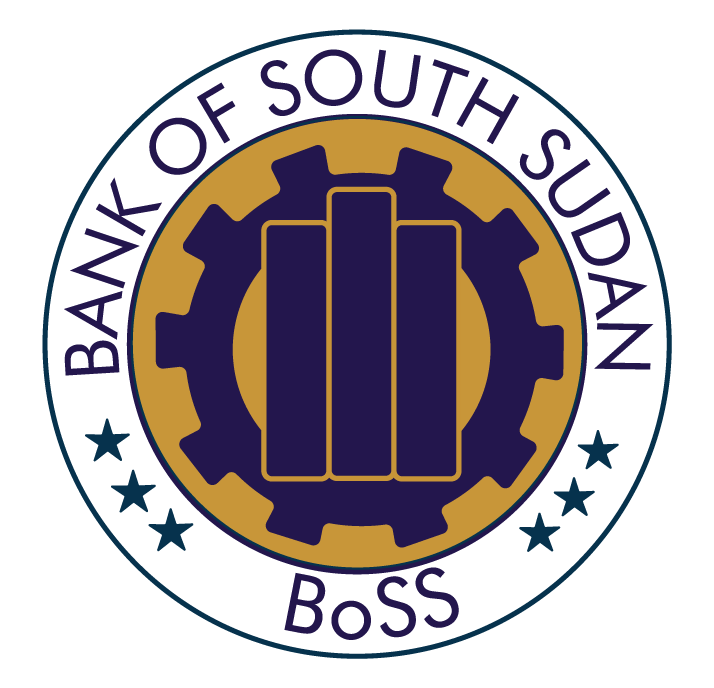
- Central bank of: South Sudan
- Headquarters: Plot No. 1, Block D 6, Juba Market, Juba, South Sudan
- Ownership: 100% state ownership
- Governor: Johnny Ohisa Damian
- Currency: South Sudanese Pound; SSP (ISO 4217)
- Reserves: 230 million USD
- Website: www.boss.gov.ss

The Bank of South Sudan (BoSS) is the central bank of the Republic of South Sudan. Established in July 2011, by an Act of Parliament (The Bank of South Sudan Act, 2011), it replaced the now defunct Bank of Southern Sudan, a former branch of the Bank of Sudan, which had served as the central bank of South Sudan, during the period between February 2005 until July 2011. The bank is fully owned by the Government of South Sudan.

== Agreements and memorandums ==
The Bank of South Sudan and Ministry of Finance and Planning have signed a Memorandum of understanding to improve liquidity and operational cash management by reducing dependency on physical cash and promoting digital transactions. The document was signed by Central Bank's first deputy governor Samuel Yanga Mikaya and first undersecretary of Finance Ministry, Malual Tap Dieu.

== Location ==
The bank maintains its headquarters in the city of Juba, the capital of South Sudan, with branches in the towns of Wau, Yei and Malakal.

== Organization and governance ==
The Bank of South Sudan is the central bank of the Republic of South Sudan. It is headed by the Governor of the Bank of South Sudan. The Bank is the only institution that is constitutionally mandated to issue the South Sudanese pound.

== Duties ==
The main functions of the Bank of South Sudan are:

1. To function as the central bank of South Sudan.
2. To establish and supervise conventional banking services in South Sudan including licenses to financial institutions according to rules and regulations issued by the board of directors.
3. The management of the bank is under the Governor of the Bank of South Sudan, who will manage the conventional banking system in South Sudan according to prevailing rules, regulation and policies.
4. To act as the bank to the Government of South Sudan, as an adviser and agent thereof in monetary and financial affairs.
5. In the discharge of the duties, responsibilities and mandates thereby required and imposed upon it, to exercise the power and supervisory authority so conferred, in a manner consistent with the ordinances and regulations stipulated in the laws that govern the bank.
6. The Bank of South Sudan shall be in charge of supervising and regulating commercial banks in South Sudan.

== Management ==
=== Governors of the Bank of South Sudan ===
The Governors are appointed by the President of South Sudan.

Name	Took office	Left office
Elijah Malok Aleng	July 2005	August 2011
Kornelio Koriom Mayiek	August 2011	January 2017
Othom Rago Ajak	January 2017	May 2018
Dier Tong Ngor	May 2018	January 2020
Jamal Abdalla Wani	January 2020	November 2020
Dier Tong Ngor	November 2020	January 2022
Moses Makur Deng	January 2022	August 2022
Johnny Ohisa Damian	August 2022	October 2023
James Alic Garang	October 2023	December 2024
Johnny Ohisa Damian	December 2024	June 2025
Addis Ababa Othow	June 2025	November 2025
Yeni Samuel Costa	November 2025	January 2026
Johnny Ohisa Damian	January 2026	July 2026
Addis Ababa Othow	July 2026	Incumbent

== See also ==
- Ministry of Finance and Economic Planning (South Sudan)
- List of banks in South Sudan
- Economy of South Sudan
- List of central banks of Africa
- List of central banks
- Banking in South Sudan
- Commonwealth banknote-issuing institutions
