= Ministry of Irrigation =

Ministry of Irrigation may refer to:

- Ministry of Irrigation (Nepal)
- Ministry of Irrigation (Syria), the ministry of irrigation of Syria
- Ministry of Irrigation and Water Resources (South Sudan)
- Ministry of Irrigation and Water Resources Management, Sri Lanka
- Ministry of Water Resources (Iraq), (also called, Ministry of Irrigation), the ministry of irrigation of Iraq
