= Ministry of Electricity and Dams =

Government ministry of South Sudan

South Sudan Ministry of Electricity, Dams, Irrigation and Water Resources
Department overview
- Formed: 2011
- Jurisdiction: South Sudan
- Headquarters: Juba
- Minister responsible: David Deng Athorbei, Minister of Electricity, Dams, Irrigation and Water Resources

The Ministry of Electricity, Dams, Irrigation and Water Resources is a ministry of the Government of South Sudan. The incumbent minister is David Deng Athorbei, while Rhoda David Alak serves as deputy minister.

== List of ministers of electricity and dams ==
	Name	Office	Party
1	David Deng Athorbei	2011–2011	Sudan People's Liberation Movement
2	Dr. Dhieu Mathok Diing	2011–2011	Sudan People's Liberation Movement
3	David Deng Athorbei	2011–2011	Sudan People's Liberation Movement
4	Rhoda David Alak	2011–2012	Sudan People's Liberation Movement
5	Dhieu Mathok Diing	2012–2015	Sudan People's Liberation Movement
6	Hon. Macham Mecham Angui	2015–2016	Sudan People's Liberation Movement
7	David Deng Athorbei	2016–2020	Sudan People's Liberation Movement
