= Lasuba =

Lasuba is a given name and surname. Notable people with the name include:

- Lasuba L. Wango (fl. from 2020), South Sudanese politician
- Agnes Kwaje Lasuba (1948–2023), South Sudanese politician
