= Ministry of Environment (South Sudan) =

Government ministry of South Sudan

South Sudan Ministry of Environment
Department overview
- Formed: 2011
- Jurisdiction: South Sudan
- Headquarters: Juba
- Minister responsible: Mabior Garang de Mabior , Minister of Environment

The Ministry of Environment and Forestry is a Government of South Sudan institution. The incumbent minister is Josephine Napwon, while Joseph Africano Bartel serves as the Under Secretary. The Ministry of Environment and Forestry is legally ordered with the Protection and preservation of lands and all the environment. Also to ensure sustainable utilization of the environmental resource base geared towards meeting the needs of both the contemporary and the future generations.

== Location ==
The headquarter of the ministry is located at Ministry of Environment and Forestry Bilpam Road, Juba, South Sudan.

== Organizational structure ==
Administratively, the ministry is divided into directorates:

- Directorate of Environment
- Directorate of Forestry

== List of ministers of environment ==
Minister	In office	Party	President	Note(s)
Alfred Lado Gore	Since July 2011	Sudan People's Liberation Movement	Salva Kiir	In office
