= Barnaba Bak Chol =

Former Minister of Finance and Economic Planning

Dr. Bak Barnaba Chol Bak
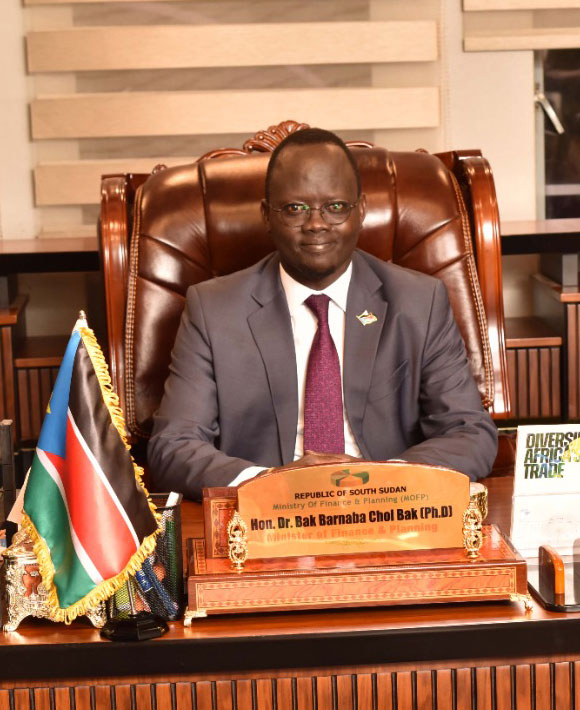
- Dr. Bak Barnaba Chol

Minister of Finance and Economic Planning
- In office 4 November 2025 – 24 February 2026
- President: Salva Kiir
- Preceded by: Athian Ding Athian
- Succeeded by: Salvatore Garang
- In office 3 August 2023 – 15 March 2024
- President: Salva Kiir
- Preceded by: Dier Tong Ngor
- Succeeded by: Awuou Daniel Chuang

Personal details
- Born: November 18, 1982 (age 43)
- Party: SPLM
- Education: PhD, BA
- Profession: economist, politician

Barnaba Bak Chol (born November 18, 1982) is a politician from South Sudan. He has been the Minister of Finance and Economic Planning for the Republic of South Sudan from 3 August 2023 to 15 March 2024, and again from 4 November 2025 until 24 February 2026

== Background ==
Barnaba Bak Chol holds a Doctorate in Business Administration with a major in finance from the United States International University in Kenya. He is an economist, and was assistant professor at the University of Juba in 2023.
