= Othom Rago Ajak =

- Born: 1954
- Died: 2025 (aged 70–71)

Othom Rago Ajak (1954-17th September 2025) was a South Sudanese banker who served as the Governor of the Bank of South Sudan from January 2017 until May 2018. He died in Cairo, Egypt on the 17th of September 2025.
