= Garang Diing Akuong =

South Sudanese politician

South Sudanese Ambassador to the United States
- Incumbent
- Assumed office February 23, 2015
- Preceded by: Akec Khoc Aciew Khoc

Personal details
- Born: 1963 (age 62–63) Aweil, South Sudan
- Spouse: Akuong is married to Josephine Nyimeda Baak.

Garang Diing Akuong (born 1963) is a South Sudanese politician and diplomat.

- As a Bachelor of Arts in international relations from the University of London in 2004 he returned to the Southern Sudan Autonomous Region (2005–11).
- In 2006 he was elected to the South Sudan assembly.
- From 2006 to 2007 he was also general secretary in the Ministry of Foreign Affairs in Khartoum.
- He then took up government posts in Northern Bahr el Ghazal state, which includes Aweil.
- Until 2008 he was state minister of health.
- In 2008 he was minister of parliamentary affairs.
- From 2008 to 2009 he was state minister of agriculture and minister of finance until 2010.
- In 2010 he joined the national government as Minister of Energy and Mining.
- From July 10, 2011, to August 7, 2011 he Minister of Energy and Mining in the Cabinet of South Sudan headed by Salva Kiir.
- From August 7, 2011 to February 23, 2015 he was Ministry of Commerce, Industry and Investment (South Sudan).
- Since February 23, 2015 he is South Sudanese Ambassador to the United States.

== See also ==
- SPLM
- SPLA
- Cabinet of South Sudan
