= Kuol Daniel Ayulo =

South Sudanese politician

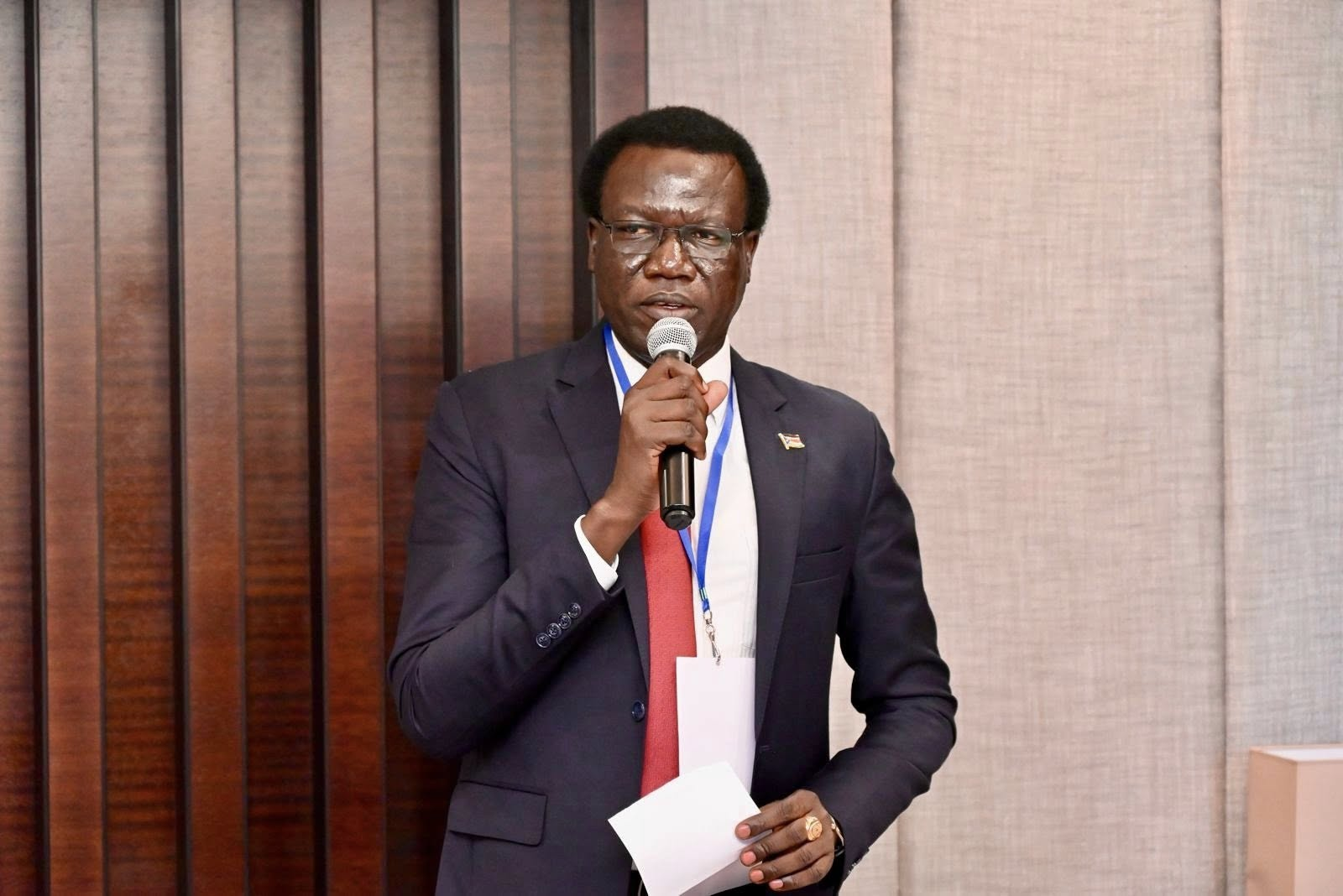

Minister of Finance and Economic Planning
- In office 7 May 2026 – 22 September 2026
- President: Salva Kiir
- Preceded by: Salvatore Garang Mabiordit
- Succeeded by: Athian Diing Athian

Minister of Finance and Planning, Lakes State
- In office 2015–2020

Personal details
- Born: June 16, 1975 (age 51) Rumbek, Lakes State, South Sudan
- Occupation: Politician, Technocrat

Kuol Daniel Ayulo (born 16 June 1975) is a South Sudanese politician, technocrat and public administrator appointed as Minister of Finance and Economic Planning of the Republic of South Sudan on 6 May 2026 by President Salva Kiir. Prior to being a Minister he served as Undersecretary at the Ministry of Trade and Industry, and First Undersecretary at the national Ministry of Finance and Economic Planning on two separate occasions between 2024 to March 2025.

== Career ==
=== Ministry of Finance, Lakes State ===
Before being appointed to serve in the national government Kuol Daniel Ayulo had served as Minister of Finance in Lakes State under the leadership of late Matur Chut Dhol who died in 2024.

=== Ministry of Finance and Economic Planning ===
Kuol Daniel Ayulo was appointed First Undersecretary at the national Ministry of Finance and Economic Planning on 6 June 2023. He was subsequently dismissed from this position on 2 October 2023 and replaced by Malual Tap Dhieu and was reassigned to Ministry of Trade and Industry.

For the second time, Ayulo was again appointed as First Undersecretary at the Ministry of Finance and Economic Planning in December 2025, serving until March 2026 replaced by Malual Tap Dhieu again

A few months later, on 6 May 2026, President Salva Kiir appointed Kuol Daniel Ayulo as the Minister of Finance and Economic Planning of the Republic of South Sudan, succeeding Salvatore Garang Mabiordit who had on served in the post since 23 February 2026. The appointment was part of a broader government reshuffle that also included changes to the military high command.

Ayulo's time as Minister of Finance and Economic Planning came to an abrupt end on 22nd September, 2026, when President Salva Kiir dissolved the transitional government to pave way for December's planned South Sudan's first national elections. President Kiir fired all 5 vice presidents, national cabinet ministers, state governor and state cabinet ministers.

In the same order issued on 22nd September, 2026 to dissolve the transitional government of nationality unity, President Salva Kiir formed a caretake government with Athian Ding Athian appointed as the Caretaker Minister of Finance and Economic Planning.

=== Ministry of Trade and Industry ===
Between his two separate posts as First Undersectary in the Ministry of Finance and Economic Planning of the Republic of South Sudan, Ayulo served as Undersecretary at the Ministry of Trade and Industry. He was dismissed in August 2024.

Government offices
Preceded by Salvatore Garang Mabiordit	Minister of Finance and Economic Planning of South Sudan; 2026–present	Succeeded by Incumbent
