= List of ambassadors of South Sudan to the United States =

Coordinates: 38.903134°N 77.060814°W

Ambassador of South Sudan to the United States
- Incumbent; Garang Diing Akuong since February 23, 2015
- Inaugural holder: Akec Khoc Aciew Khoc
- Formation: July 30, 2012

The South Sudanese Ambassador in Washington, D. C. is the official representative of the Government in Juba to the Government of the United States.

== List of representatives ==
Diplomatic agreement/designated	Diplomatic accreditation	Ambassador	Observations	List of heads of state of South Sudan	List of presidents of the United States	Term end
July 24, 2012	July 30, 2012	Akec Khoc Aciew Khoc	(* January 1, 1956): From 1991 to 2003 he was Sudan People's Liberation Movement’s representative in Paris.	Salva Kiir	Barack Obama	
February 13, 2015	February 23, 2015	Garang Diing Akuong		Salva Kiir	Barack Obama	
September 18, 2024	September 24, 2024	Santino Fardol Watod Dicken		Salva Kiir	Donald Trump	
