= Melut County =

Maluth
- County
- Location in South Sudan
- Coordinates: 10.440419°N 32.201529°E
- Country: South Sudan
- Region: Greater Upper Nile
- State: Upper Nile State
- Headquarters: Melut

Area
  - Total: 2,683 sq mi (6,948 km^{2})

Population (2017 estimate)
  - Total: 70,659
  - Density: 26.34/sq mi (10.17/km^{2})
- Time zone: UTC+2 (CAT)

Melut County is an administrative area of Upper Nile State in the Greater Upper Nile region of South Sudan.

== Location ==
Melut County is bordered by Manyo County across the Nile in the west, Maban County in the east, Baliet County in the south and Renk County in the north, all in Upper Nile state. The county contains the Payams of Melut, Paloch, Bemichuk, Galdora, Wunamom and Panamdit The region is one of wide, flat and low-lying plains with black cotton soils, covered by Savannah grasslands and acacia trees. The river Nile is the main transportation route.

== People ==
The largest communities in the county are Dinka, Shilluk, Burun, Fur, Nubian and Nuer people. There are many migrants in the towns of Melut, Paloch and Galdora.

In September 2010 a traditional leadership council in the county condemned inappropriate dressing in the public, saying that young women who dressed in an alluring way wanted to pass on HIV. A community elder said "If women start dressing decently no man will have to look at them and people will only have their wives. The way they are dressing today, they are leading young men astray". Local authorities are trying to counter negative attitudes such as this through education.

In 2015 Melut county was divided into two counties, Melut and they claimed Adar area of Maban tribe as theirs, composed of four payams (Goldra Payam, Wunamaum Payam, Panamdit Payam, and Thiangrial), Melut county compose of (Melut Payam, Paloch Payam and Bomuchok Payam) which become Greater Melut and citizen are pure Dinka (Nyiel and Ager) Melut is backbone Oil of south Sudan.

== Economy ==
The River Nile and its small seasonal tributaries are the main sources of drinking water, fishing grounds and water for cattle, particularly in the dry season. Most people relay on agro-pastoralism for a living, and engage in small scale trading. The main seasonal crop is sorghum, and to a lesser extent maize. Crops grown on a small scale throughout the year include tomatoes, okra and onions. NGOs such as the Fellowship for African Relief (FAR) have provided agricultural training, particularly for young adults who have returned to the county, and during their time in Khartoum or in refugee camps did not learn the required skills.

Melut gives its name to the Melut Basin. Chevron discovered a major oil field in this basin. Major oil wells were drilled on lands that were previously used for cultivation and cattle grazing have directly affected the livelihood of the population.

== Health ==
Water supplies are untreated and there is no treatment of human waste, leading to extensive disease. As of March 2006, of 20% of the population suffered from Global Acute Malnutrition and 1.7% from Severe Acute Malnutrition. Other than malnutrition, common causes of death are chest infections in the dry season, and malaria and diarrhoeal diseases during the wet season.

The government-run Melut Hospital has been open since February 2005 with two doctors, one medical assistant, one pharmacist, one laboratory technician and ten nurses. The hospital has one male ward and two female wards, and a theatre which performs minor surgeries. The laboratory is not equipped for comprehensive diagnosis. Medair opened a Primary Health Care Center in Melut Payam in February 2007. As well as the main clinic, Medair has supported six primary health care units run by the Ministry of Health in remote areas of the county.

== Notable people ==
- Stephen Dhieu Dau is from Melut County. He is the former Minister of Finance and Planning in the Government of the Republic of South Sudan
