= Kosti Manibe Ngai =

South Sudanese politician (1940s–2026)

Kosti Manibe Ngai (1947 or 1948 – 11 August 2026) was a South Sudanese politician, associated for much of his career with the Sudan People's Liberation Army/Movement (SPLA/M).

He worked as the SPLA/M education commissioner in the early 2000s and, following peace agreements, worked as a government minister in both the Government of National Unity and in the South Sudanese regional government.

Upon the country's independence, he was appointed the caretaker Minister for Cabinet Affairs in the Cabinet of South Sudan and, subsequently, the country's Minister of Finance and Economic Planning.

He was dismissed from this post in 2013 by president Salva Kiir over allegations of corruption; Kiir subsequently dismissed much of his cabinet and, at the beginning of the South Sudanese Civil War, the government accused Manibe and other senior SPLM politicians of planning a coup and had him arrested.

Manibe was released the following month into Kenya. He remained politically active, associated with Pagan Amum and the United People's Alliance in his later years. Manibe died in August 2026 in Nairobi, Kenya.

== Education ==
Manibe attended the Rumbek Senior Secondary School in Sudan for two years; however, part way through his attendance, the school closed. He moved to Uganda, assisted by Anyanya soldiers. He graduated from the Makerere University in Kampala, Uganda, where he studied arts; Manibe also studied at the Khartoum School of Mass Communication.

== Career ==
Manibe initially worked in church administration, joining the Sudan Council of Churches in 1978. By 1988, he had become a Deputy General Secretary at the organization's offices in Juba. By 1991, he had gone on leave. He also edited the newspaper Nile Mirror.

Manibe later joined the Sudan People's Liberation Army/Movement (SPLA/M), where he worked as their education commissioner in the early 2000s. After the signing of the Comprehensive Peace Agreement by the SPLM and the government of Sudan in 2005, establishing South Sudan as an autonomous region, Manibe became the minister of humanitarian affairs at the Government of National Unity in Khartoum. He served in the role until 2007, when he became the minister of investment. From June 2010 to July 2011, he worked in the South Sudanese government as the minister of cabinet affairs.

South Sudan became independent on 9 June 2011, following a referendum earlier than year. The next day, Manibe was appointed as the caretaker Minister for Cabinet Affairs in the newly-formed Cabinet of South Sudan. In August of that year, he was appointed the Minister of Finance and Economic Planning, succeeding David Deng Athorbei. His appointment was criticized by those who felt he did not have enough experience for the posting. In his role, he helped South Sudan establish both financial institutions and relationships with financial institutions.

In June 2013, Manibe and fellow minister Deng Alor Kuol were suspended from their positions by president Salva Kiir, via presidential decree, over allegations of corruption. Two two men were accused of an "unprocedural transfer" of nearly $8m to the Daffy Investment Group, ostensibly to buy fire resistant safes for government buildings. Kiir removed both men's immunities and announced an investigation, to be led by John Gatwech Lul; Manibe responded by calling the allegations "a politically instigated motive to drag my name into it".

The suspensions came as part of a series of dismissals by Kiir; their suspensions were criticized by vice president Riek Machar and SPLM secretary general Pagan Amum. After critiquing more of Kiir's dismissals, and after Machar announced he would run against Kiir in a future election, Kiir suspended both of them alongside the rest of his cabinet.

The following December, at the onset of the South Sudanese Civil War, Manibe and nine other senior SPLM politicians, including John Luk Jok and Gier Choung Aloung, were arrested; the South Sudan government accused them, alongside Machar, of planning a coup. He was released from custody into Kenya in January. The group would later become known in the country as G10, or SPLM Former Detainees.

In later years, Manibe allied himself with Pagan Amum and the United People's Alliance. In 2017, Manibe and several other opposition politicians were invited to a national dialogue committee. Manibe learnt of his appointment after it was publicly announced and declined it.

== Personal life and death ==
Kosti Manibe Ngai was born in Western Equatoria. He was married to Reverend Nediye Gone.

In 2021, Manibe was diagnosed with cardiac amyloidosis. In the final weeks of his life, he was hospitalized at the M.P. Shah Hospital in Nairobi, Kenya, while undergoing treatment for heart disease. He died there on 11 August 2026, at the age of 78.
