= Agak Achuil Lual =

South Sudanese politician

Minister of Finance
- In office 12 November 2021 – 4 August 2022
- President: Salva Kiir
- Preceded by: Athian Ding Athian
- Succeeded by: Dier Tong Ngor

Agak Achuil Lual is a South Sudanese Politician. He served as the Minister of Finance and Economic Planning since November 2021 under the Transitional Government of National Unity, was relieved in August 2022.

== Career ==
He became the first Undersecretary of Trade and Industry on March 19, 2018. He was formerly in the Ministry of Finance and Economic Planning as Undersecretary dealing with financial management matters and also he served as a Minister of Finance and Economic Planning in 2021 until his removal in August, 2022. Agak's prior public service includes being Director General in the Ministry of Petroleum and Mining. Prior to joining the government, he worked with the UNDP as Finance Management Specialist.

He also served as a Senior Logistic Coordinator for UNDP in Rumbek. Agak also served with UN/OCHA in Aweil East and Northern Bahr El Ghazal as a Field Officer.

== Education ==
He holds Bachelor of Commerce (Accounting & Business Administration) from University of Zagazig, Egypt, and Higher Diploma in Administration from Heritage College, Ottawa, Canada. He also holds a Post Graduate Diploma and Masters of Science in Accounting & Finance from University of Juba, Republic of South Sudan.

== Controversy (sale of oil) ==
While addressing media in Juba during a joint press briefing with the Central Bank of South Sudan, Minister Agak Achuil Lual said that, "the reason the country has been unable to pay civil servants’ salary arrears since January, is because the oil of the country had been sold till 2027", which he later explained, that what he “meant was the crude (oil) spreadsheet and commitments on the developmental projects until 2027, and it doesn’t mean that South Sudan oil has been sold out.”
