= Trade unions in Sudan =

This article discusses the history and present status of labor unions in Sudan.

== History ==
The labor-union movement in Sudan originated in 1946 with the formation, by some Sudan Railways employees, of the Workers' Affairs Association. Two years later, the Trades and Tradesmen's Union Ordinance of 1948, which was based largely on the British model and the concepts of voluntary association and limited government intervention in union affairs, gave official sanction to the unions. A proliferation of mostly small, ineffective bodies emerged. The major exception was the rail union, which became Sudan's wealthiest and most powerful union. In 1949 the workers' association helped start the national Workers' Congress, which in 1950 became the Sudan Workers' Trade Union Federation (SWTUF). The SWTUF was closely associated with the Sudan Communist Party (SCP), and its actions were strongly political. It failed to receive government recognition. After national independence, the federation had frequent confrontations with the new government, including a successful general strike in October 1958. That strike was one of the factors that contributed to the military takeover of the government the following month.

The SWTUF controlled roughly 70 percent of all labor-union membership by the 1958 coup. The new military government repealed the 1948 ordinance, dissolved all unions, and detained many of the federation's leaders. Some union organization was again permitted after 1960, but it was prohibited for white-collar workers, and federations were not allowed. Upon restoration of the civilian government in 1964, the 1948 ordinance was reinstated, the SWTUF reemerged, and union membership increased rapidly. Most unions were small, financially weak, and generally not very effective. The few larger unions were in the public sector, led by the Sudan Railway Workers' Union.

SWTUF leadership remained in communist hands. The SCP was allied with the group that carried out the military coup of May 1969. Strikes, however, were prohibited by a presidential order issued shortly after the 1969 takeover. After the abortive communist coup in mid-1971, the government dissolved the SWTUF and executed a number of its leaders.

Late in 1971, the government promulgated the new Trade Unions Act, under which directives were issued in 1973 that established a list of 87 unions based along sectoral, occupational, and industrial lines. Somewhat more than half were “employees” unions (for white-collar employees), and the rest “workers” unions (for blue-collar workers). The existing unions were merged into the specified groupings. The act contained measures to strengthen unionism, including a provision for compulsory dues and employer-paid time off to serve as union officials. The SWTUF was reinstituted for the workers' unions, and the Sudanese Federation of Employees and Professionals Trade Unions was formed in 1975 for the white-collar group. Their representation of union interests was carried on within guidelines set by the government and the Sudan Socialist Union, the mass political party established by the government in 1972. In the late 1970s, the unions led strikes, which, although illegal, resulted in settlement of issues through negotiations with the government. Prior to 1989, the SWTUF, in its weakened state, included 42 trade unions, representing more than 1.7 million workers in the public and private sectors. The federation was affiliated with the International Confederation of Arab Trade Unions and the Organization of African Trade Union Unity.

Following the 1989 coup, the Revolutionary Command Council for National Salvation temporarily suspended the right to organize and bargain collectively and prescribed punishments, including the death penalty, for violations of its labor decrees. Many union leaders were arrested. Prior to the 1989 coup, leaders of the SWTUF formed a union in exile, the Legitimate Sudan Workers Trade Union Federation, which carried on secret trade union activities in Sudan.

The Trade Union Act of 1992 facilitated the government's definition of the sectors, industries, and companies that could form trade unions, allowed it to intervene in the internal affairs of the unions and their elections, and provided for the suspension or dissolution of the unions. In 1993 the government amalgamated the 107 sectoral trade unions into 26 trade unions. In 1996 the number was reduced to 13 unions. The Labor Act of 1997 included a section on resolution of trade disputes and a requirement that employers negotiate with employees through a lawful trade union if they had such representation.

Strikes and protests occurred in 1998 over the privatization of state corporations and public services, an action that had caused massive job losses. In 1999 and again in 2000, teachers went on strike for several months, each time to protest the government's failure to pay salaries.

The 1998 constitution provided the right of association for trade-union purposes, but in 2011 the government continued to restrict this right. Only the government-controlled SWTUF, the leading blue-collar labor organization with about 800,000 members, functioned legally. The government again imposed severe punishments, including the death penalty, for violation of its labor decrees. However, the International Labour Organization frequently noted that the trade-union monopoly was contrary to the principles of freedom of association, and the International Confederation of Free Trade Unions continued to recognize the Legitimate Sudan Workers Trade Union Federation, the national trade-union organization that functioned prior to the ban and that continued to operate in exile.

== Current status ==
As of 2011, the law allowed labor committees the right to organize and bargain collectively; however, in practice, the government's control of the steering committees meant that it dominated the process of setting wages and working conditions. The law also did not prohibit anti-union discrimination. Moreover, strikes were considered illegal unless the government granted approval, which never occurred. Therefore, most employees who tried to strike were subject to employment termination, although workers who went on strike in recent years, including in 2008, were not terminated, and there were no reports of union leaders being detained or unfairly dismissed in 2011.

== See also ==
- Sudan Doctors Union – Doctors syndicate in Sudan
- Sudanese Journalists Syndicate – Journalistic syndicate in Sudan
