= James Alic Garang =

South Sudanese economist

- Born: Ajok Village, Ayat Center, Aweil West County, Northern Bahr el Ghazal State, Sudan (now South Sudan)
- Education: University of Massachusetts; University of Utah
- Occupations: Governor of the Bank of South Sudan, Economist, Banker
- Writing career
- Years active: 2009–present

James Alic Garang is a South Sudanese economist, Chair of Monetary Affairs Committee of the East Africa Community and the former governor of the Bank of South Sudan. He previously served as a senior advisor to the Executive Director at the IMF Executive Board in Washington, DC. Garang assumed the office after being appointed by President Salva Kiir on October 4, 2023.

== Early life and education ==
Garang was born in Ajok Village, Ayat Center, Aweil West County, Northern Bahr el Ghazal State in what is now South Sudan.

After completing high school, Garang relocated to the United States through the Lost Boys of Sudan program. He immediately enrolled at Salt Lake Community College, where he graduated with an Associate Degree in 2003.

In May 2006, he graduated from the University of Utah with honors Degree of Science. In December 2009, he attained a Master of Arts Degree in Economics from the University of Massachusetts Amherst, and in May 2014, he attained a PhD in Economics from the same institution.

== Career ==
Garang profession started at the Upper Nile University as an Assistant Professor and Deputy Dean. He worked as an intern for African Development Bank in Tunis, Tunisia between 2009 and 2010. He was also the banking sector's lead evaluator for the Comprehensive Evaluation of the Government of Southern Sudan (2006-2010) and worked as a consultant of the Republic of South Sudan (June –August 2011) and World Bank South Sudan Office (2013-2014).

Garang was an advisor to the Executive Director (AfG1 Constituency) of the International Monetary Fund (2017-2021), and Senior Advisor of the IMF Executive Director (AfG1 Constituency) (2021-2023). He also worked as consultant of World Bank South Sudan Office (2013-2014); National Consultant on “Assessing Economic Benefits and Costs of South Sudan Accession to EAC,” Imani Development Ltd, South Africa (2014-2015); Columnist of the Juba Telegraph, and Senior Economist with the Ebony Center for Strategic Studies based in Juba, South Sudan.

Garang is also the founder of the Africa Center for Financial Inclusion, a non-profit institution that promotes inclusive financial system in Africa.

In July 2024, he received the African Economic Resilience and Growth Champion Award at the 14th African Business Leadership Awards (ABLA), which was held from 4 to 5 July 2024. The award ceremony was a highlight of the ALM Africa Summit London 2024.

In July 2024, he represented South Sudan at the African Leadership Summit, which was held on the 17 to 18 July 2024 at the Hilton London Metropole and House of Lords, London, United Kingdom.

In September 2024, Garang launched a cashless campaign drive urging South Sudanese citizens to embrace electronic payment options, such as mobile money, debit cards and credit cards as a way of promoting digitization of financial services.

== Publications ==
Garang has published in various economic and related disciplines in various journals:

- Garang, James Alic (2023-11-01), "Exploiting Technology during the Pandemic: Early Lessons from Sub-Saharan Africa", New Topics in Emerging Markets, IntechOpen, ISBN 978-1-83769-133-3
- Akech, Joseph Geng; Garang, James Alic; Mayai, Augustino Ting (2023-02-28). "On Navigating the Roadmap: A Path Towards Democratization and Prosperity". The Sudd Institute.
- Garang, James Alic; Mayai, Augustino Ting (2023-02-14). "Pope Francis's Visit to South Sudan and its Significance". The Sudd Institute.
- Garang, James Alic (2022-12-06). "Key Milestones on South Sudan's Engagement with the International Monetary Fund". The Sudd Institute.
- James, Garang Yach; Garang, James Alic; Akech, Joseph Geng (2022-07-01). "On Designating the 14-Mile Area in the Cooperation Agreement: Missteps and Implications for Peace in South Sudan. | African Journal on Conflict Resolution | EBSCOhost". openurl.ebsco.com.
- Garang, James Alic (2022-08-02). "It takes a Village to Raise a Child: South Sudan's Reengagement Strategy with Key International Financial Institutions". The Sudd Institute.
- LeRiche, Matthew; Garang, James Alic; Reng, Ariic David Aguto; Tiitmamer, Nhial; Mayai, Augustino Ting (2022-02-08). "Salary Adjustment for the South Sudanese Legislature: Policy Implications". The Sudd Institute.
- Garang, James Alic (2021-06-03). "Will the Impact of the Pandemic on the Expected National Output Persist?". The Sudd Institute.
- Garang, James Alic; Akau, Samuel Garang; Mayai, Augustino Ting (2018-04-18). "Food Security and Nutrition Vulnerability and Risk Analysis in Former Warrap and Northern Bahr el Ghazal States". The Sudd Institute.
- Garang, James Alic (2015). "How to leverage oil resources to enhance SME financing in South Sudan". International Journal of Economic Policy in Emerging Economies. 8 (2): 119. doi:10.1504/IJEPEE.2015.069604. ISSN 1752-0452.
- Garang, James A. (2014). The Financial Sector and Inclusive Development in Africa: Essays on Access to Finance for Small and Medium-Sized Enterprises in South Sudan and Kenya (Thesis). University of Massachusetts Amherst. doi:10.7275/mkxg-xt62.
- Garang, James Alic (2013-02-01). "The Question of Big Government, and Financial Viability: The Case of South Sudan". The Sudd Institute.
- "South Sudan can unlock its economic potential with the help of investors".
