= Melut =

Melut Maluth
- Town
- Location in South Sudan
- Coordinates: 10.440419°N 32.201529°E
- Country: South Sudan
- Region: Greater Upper Nile
- State: Upper Nile
- County: Melut County
- Time zone: UTC+2 (CAT)

Melut is a community in the Melut County of Upper Nile State in the Greater Upper Nile region of South Sudan. It is the headquarters of Melut County.

== Location ==
The town is on the east bank of the White Nile, just below the point where the Adar River enters the Nile. The region is one of wide, flat and low lying plains with black cotton soils, covered by Savannah grasslands and acacia trees. The River Nile and its small seasonal tributaries are the main sources of drinking water, fishing grounds and water for cattle, particularly in the dry season. The river Nile is also the main transportation route. The largest communities in the county are Dinka, Shilluk, Burun, Fur, Nubian and Nuer people. Most people relay on agro-pastoralism for a living, and engage in small scale trading.

Melut gives its name to the Melut Basin. Chevron discovered a major oil field in this basin in 1981. In October 1996 the GPC consortium drilled and reopened Chevron's wells and built an all-weather road connecting the Adar oilfield to Melut.

== Facilities ==
Gideon Theological College was jointly founded by the Sudan Interior Church (SIC) and the Sudanese Church of Christ (SCOC) in 1976 but is run as an inter-denominational school. The College moved north to Khartoum in 1988 due to heavy fighting in the area Second Sudanese Civil War (1983-2005) and then moved back to Melut in 2007. The compound had been used and misused by the army during the war and required extensive rebuilding. In November 2007 Medair moved its Primary Health Care Center at Melut into a new building. Until then the Center, the only source of health care in the town, had been operating out of tents.

== Security ==
On 10 November 2010, the Sudan Armed Forces (SAF) component of the Joint Integrated Units opened fire on positions of the Sudan People's Liberation Army (SPLA) component and the United Nations Mission in Sudan (UNMIS) in Melut, killing a teenage girl and wounding others. SAF attributed this violation of the ceasefire to drunken soldiers. To avoid any risk of escalation, the SPLA did not respond.
