= Ministry of Finance and Economic Planning (South Sudan) =

Government ministry of South Sudan

South Sudan Ministry of Finance and Economic Planning
Ministry overview
- Formed: 2011
- Superseding Ministry: Ministry of Finance and Economic Planning (MoFEP)
- Jurisdiction: South Sudan
- Headquarters: Ministries Road, Juba
- Minister responsible: Kuol Daniel Ayulo, Minister of Finance and Economic Planning
- Website: https://mofp.gov.ss/

The Ministry of Finance and Planning is a ministry of the Government of South Sudan. This ministry was first headed by David Deng Athorbei after the country gained her independence from Sudan in 2011.

However, the ministry of Finance and economic planning has issued statement in 2022 stopping the issuance of bank overdraft and will prefer injecting more U$D into the market.

== List of ministers of finance ==
=== Before independence ===
Ministers responsible for finance in Southern Sudan autonomous region.

Name	Took office	Left office	Notes
Arthur Akuien Chol	22 October 2005	28 March 2007	
Gabriel Changson Chang	28 March 2007	2 July 2007	
Koul Athian Mawien	2 July 2007	31 March 2009	
David Deng Athorbei	31 May 2009	9 July 2011	

=== Since 2011 ===
Ministers responsible for finance after independence since July 2011.

Name	Took office	Left office	Notes
David Deng Athorbie	9 July 2011	26 August 2011	
Kosti Manibe Ngai	26 August 2011	23 July 2013	
Aggrey Tisa Sabuni	31 July 2013	12 January 2015	
David Deng Athorbie	12 January 2015	28 April 2016	
Stephen Dhieu Dau	28 April 2016	12 March 2018	
Salvatore Garang	12 March 2018	16 September 2020	
Athian Diing Athian	16 September 2020	12 November 2021	
Agak Achuil Lual	12 November 2021	4 August 2022	
Dier Tong Ngor	4 August 2022	3 August 2023	
Barnaba Bak Chol	3 August 2023	15 March 2024	
Awuou Daniel Chuang	15 March 2024	15 July 2024	
Marial Dongrin	15 July 2024	22 August 2025	
Athian Diing Athian	22 August 2025	4 November 2025	
Barnaba Bak Chol	4 November 2025	24 February 2026	
Salvatore Garang	24 February 2026	6 May 2026	
Kuol Daniel Ayulo	6 May 2026	22 September 2026	
Athian Diing Athian	22 September 2026	Incumbent	

== See also ==
- Bank of South Sudan
