= South Sudanese pound =

Official currency of the Republic of South Sudan

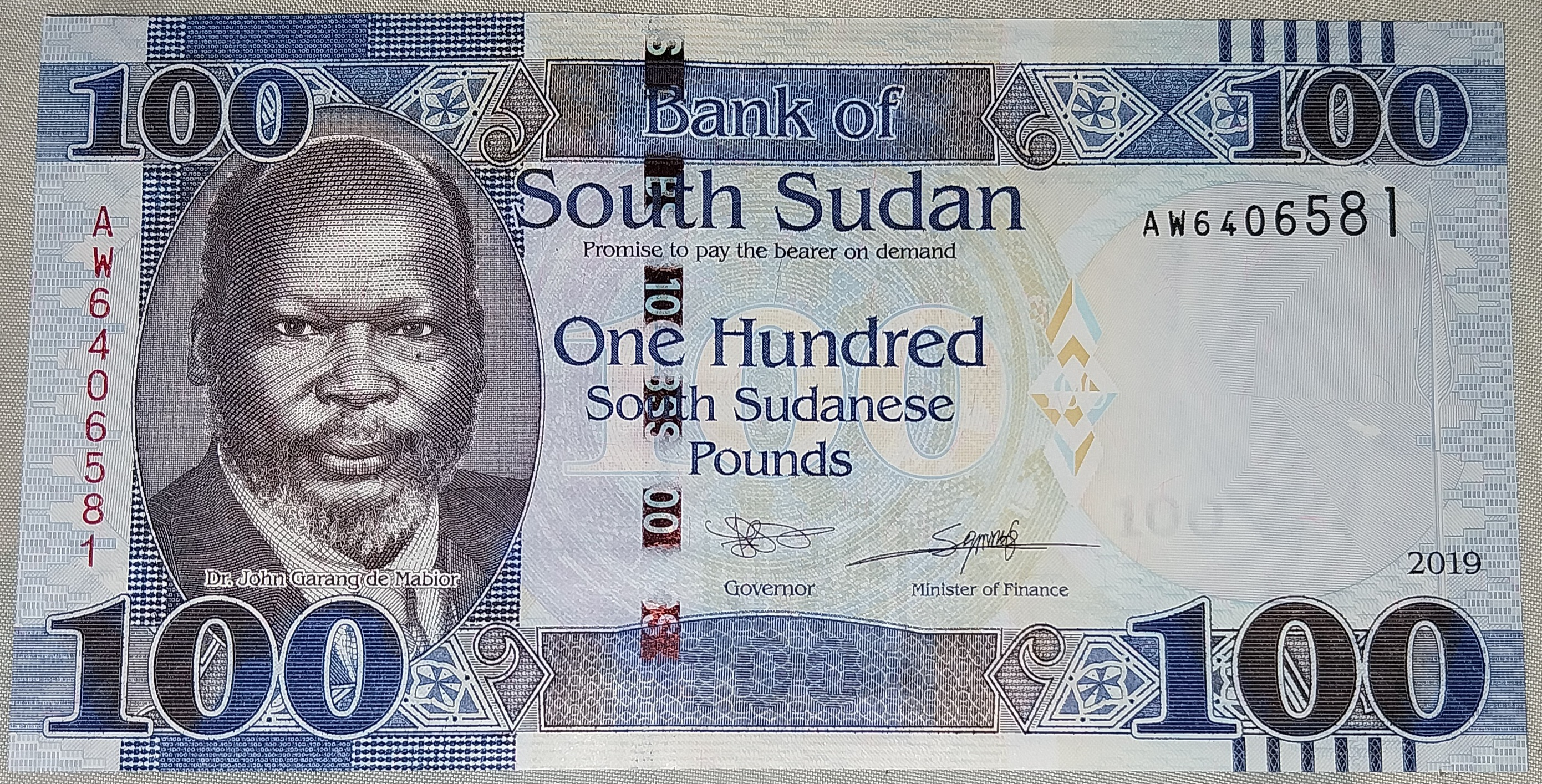
- South Sudanese 100 pound note

ISO 4217
- Code: SSP (numeric: 728)
- Subunit: 0.01

Units of account
- Subunit
- 1/100: Piaster

Denominations
- Banknotes: SSP 1, SSP 5, SSP 10, SSP 20, SSP 25, SSP 50, SSP 100, SSP 500, and SSP 1,000
- Coins: SSP 0.10, SSP 0.20, SSP 0.50, SSP 1, and SSP 2

Demographics
- Date of introduction: 18 July 2011; 15 years ago
- Replaced: Sudanese pound
- User(s): South Sudan

Issuance
- Central bank: Bank of South Sudan

Valuation
- Inflation: 40.2%
- Source: IMF (2023)
- Method: CPI

The South Sudanese pound (ISO code and abbreviation: SSP) is the currency of the Republic of South Sudan. It is subdivided into 100 piasters. It was approved by the Southern Sudan Legislative Assembly before secession on 9 July 2011 from Sudan.

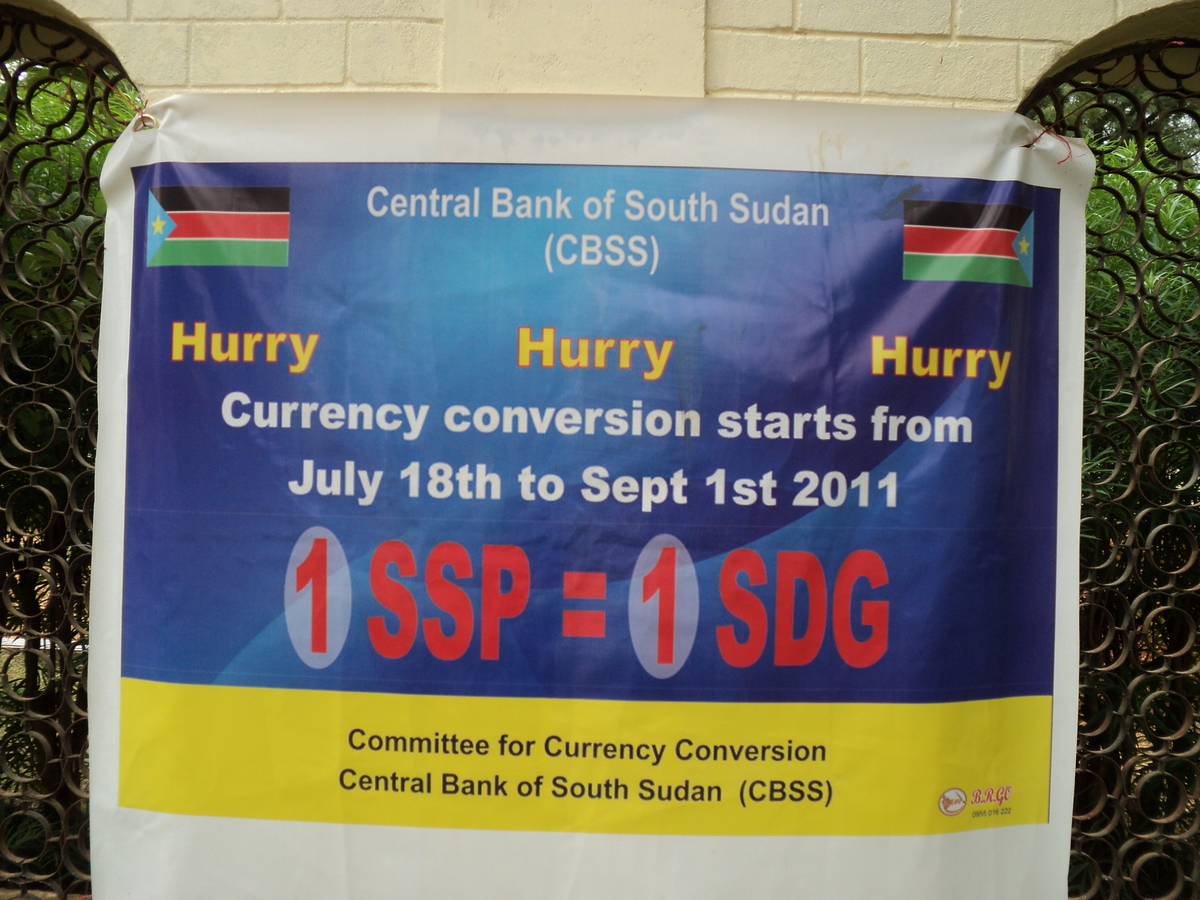
Banner in Juba announcing the conversion from the Sudanese pound (SDG) to the new currency the South Sudanese pound (SSP)

It was introduced on 18 July 2011, and replaced the Sudanese pound at par. On 1 September 2011, the Sudanese pound ceased to be legal tender in South Sudan.

On 8 October 2020, due to rapid depreciation of the South Sudanese pound's exchange rate with the United States dollar, South Sudan announced that it would soon change its currency.

== Banknotes ==
The banknotes feature the image of John Garang de Mabior, the late leader of South Sudan's independence movement.

Six different denominations (SSP 1, SSP 5, SSP 10, SSP 25, SSP 50, SSP 100 and SSP 500) in the form of banknotes have been confirmed, and five denominations (SSP 0.01, SSP 0.05, SSP 0.10, SSP 0.25 and SSP 0.50) will be issued in the form of coins.

Three new banknotes for SSP 0.05, SSP 0.10, and SSP 0.25 were issued 19 October 2011.

The first circulation coins of the South Sudanese pound in denominations of SSP 0.10, SSP 0.20, and SSP 0.50 were issued 9 July 2015, on occasion of the fourth anniversary of independence from Sudan.

In 2016, the Bank of South Sudan issued a SSP 20 banknote to replace the SSP 25 note. In 2018, the Bank of South Sudan introduced a SSP 500 banknote to ease daily cash transactions following years of inflation.

As part of a currency redesign to reduce confusion, a SSP 1 coin was released to replace the SSP 1 banknote, and a coin for SSP 2 has also been released. The SSP 10, SSP 20 and SSP 100 notes were all redesigned.

In November 2016, the Governor of the Bank of South Sudan issued a statement dismissing as false reports claiming that the bank was printing new notes in denominations of SSP 200, SSP 500 and SSP 1,000.

In February 2021, the Bank of South Sudan issued a SSP 1,000 banknote as part of an effort to combat rising inflation and economic crisis. The maroon banknote features a familiar design of John Garang on the obverse, and an image of two ostriches on the reverse.

Banknotes of the South Sudanese pound
| Images | Value | Obverse | Reverse | Watermark |
|---|---|---|---|---|
| | SSP 0.05 | Dr. John Garang de Mabior | Ostrich | The Flag of South Sudan in repeated rows and Dr. John Garang de Mabior on the right front of the note |
| | SSP 0.10 | Dr. John Garang de Mabior | Kudu | The Flag of South Sudan in repeated rows and Dr. John Garang de Mabior on the right front of the note |
| | SSP 0.25 | Dr. John Garang de Mabior | River Nile | The Flag of South Sudan in repeated rows and Dr. John Garang de Mabior on the right front of the note |
| | SSP 1 | Dr. John Garang de Mabior | Giraffes | Dr. John Garang de Mabior and an electrotype 1 |
| | SSP 5 | Dr. John Garang de Mabior | Sanga cattle | Dr. John Garang de Mabior and an electrotype 5 |
| | SSP 10 | Dr. John Garang de Mabior | Buffaloes; pineapple | Dr. John Garang de Mabior and an electrotype 10 |
| | SSP 20 | Dr. John Garang de Mabior | Oryx antelopes; oil derrick | Dr. John Garang de Mabior and an electrotype 20 |
| | SSP 50 | Dr. John Garang de Mabior | Elephants | Dr. John Garang de Mabior and an electrotype 50 |
| | SSP 100 | Dr. John Garang de Mabior | Lion; waterfall | Dr. John Garang de Mabior and an electrotype 100 |
| | SSP 500 | Dr. John Garang de Mabior | River Nile | Dr. John Garang de Mabior and an electrotype 500 |
| | SSP 1,000 | Dr. John Garang de Mabior | Ostriches | Dr. John Garang de Mabior and an electrotype 1000 |

== Coins ==
Coins in denominations of SSP 0.10, SSP 0.20, and SSP 0.50 were put into circulation on 9 July 2015 (South Sudanese Independence Day). As of 2016, South Sudan's coins are being struck at the South African Mint.

Bimetallic coins in denominations of SSP 1 and SSP 2 were put into circulation during 2016.

The Coat of arms of South Sudan with the country name 'REPUBLIC OF SOUTH SUDAN' and the date will appear on the obverses. The various coins will include the following:

- SSP 0.10 - Copper-plated Steel - Oil rig.
- SSP 0.20 - Brass-plated Steel - Shoebill stork.
- SSP 0.50 - Nickel-plated Steel - Northern white rhino.
- SSP 1 - Bronze-plated Steel centre / Nickel-plated Steel ring - Nubian giraffe.
- SSP 2 - Nickel-plated Steel centre / Bronze-plated Steel ring - African Shield.

== Exchange rates ==
At the time of introduction of the South Sudanese pound in 2011, the exchange rate was SSP 2.75 for US$1. As of 20 August 2024, the commercially available exchange rate was SSP 2290.94 for US$1, and the parallel exchange rate was SSP 4850 for US$1.
