= Sudanese pound =

Currency of Sudan

جنيه سوداني (Arabic)
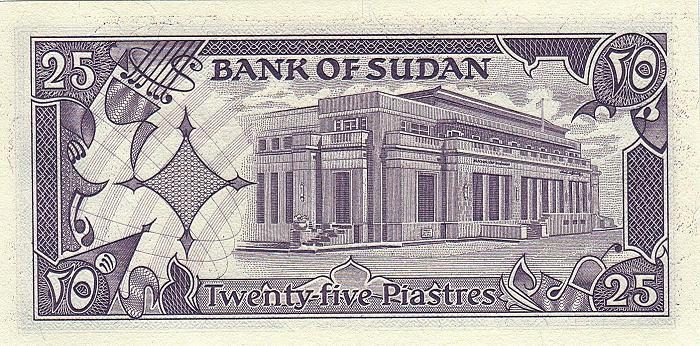
- Reverse of a 25-piastre banknote

ISO 4217
- Code: SDG (numeric: 938)
- Subunit: 0.01

Units of account
- Symbol: None official. The abbreviations LS or ج.س are used
- Subunit
- 1/100: piastre (qirsh)
- Symbol
- piastre (qirsh): PT

Denominations
- Banknotes: LS 2, LS 5, LS 10, LS 20, LS 50, LS 100, LS 200, LS 500, LS 1,000, LS 2,000
- Coins: 1 PT, 5 PT, 10 PT, 20 PT, 50 PT, LS 1

Demographics
- User(s): Sudan

Issuance
- Central bank: Sudan Currency Board (1957-1960); Central Bank of Sudan (1960-)
- Website: www.cbos.gov.sd

Valuation
- Inflation: 26.14%
- Source: https://sudantribune.com/article/319156

The Sudanese pound (Arabic: جنيه سوداني "Jineh Sudani"; abbreviation: LS in Latin, ج.س in Arabic, historically also £Sd; ISO code: SDG) is the currency of the Republic of the Sudan. The pound is divided into 100 piastres (or qirsh (قرش) in Arabic). It is issued by the Central Bank of Sudan.

The pound fell for the first time since 1997 after the United States imposed economic sanctions on Sudan. The Sudanese pound continued its decline to an unprecedented exchange rate, falling to LS 53 against the dollar. This situation, which drained all economic measures, led to heavy losses in the external repercussions of the Sudan as a whole, in the light of the government cut, interrupted by some of the failed actions announced by the Central Bank of Sudan, a severe shortage of liquidity.

The Sudanese pound fell against the US dollar after the Central Bank of Sudan announced the lifting of the cash reserve to counter inflation. Since the secession of South Sudan in 2011, Sudan has suffered from a scarcity of foreign exchange as a result of the loss of three-quarters of its oil resources and 80% of foreign exchange resources. The Sudanese government quoted the official price of the dollar from LS 6.09 to LS 18.07 in the budget of 2018 and LS 375.11 in March 2021.

== History ==
For a wider history surrounding currency in the region, see British currency in the Middle East.

=== First pound (SDP) ===
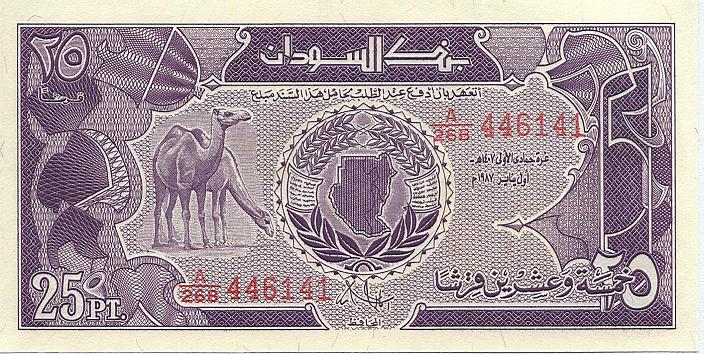
25-piastre note (1987)

The first pound to circulate in Sudan was the Egyptian pound. The late 19th-century rulers Muhammad ibn Abdalla (the Mahdi) and Abdallahi ibn Muhammad (the Khalifa) both issued coins which circulated alongside the Egyptian currency. When Anglo-Egyptian rule in Sudan ceased on 1 January 1956, and Sudan became an independent country, a distinct Sudanese currency (the Sudanese pound) was created, replacing the Egyptian pound at par.

The Egyptian pound was subdivided into 100 piastres (Arabic: قروش, singular qirsh, قرش, English: piastre, abbreviation: PT). The piastre used to be subdivided into 40 para, but decimalisation following the 1886 Egyptian currency reform established a unit equal to 0.1 piastre or 0.001 pound, which came to be known as a millim (abbreviated to mm/mms in Sudan) (ملّيمات, singular: ملّيم). Due to this legacy, the post 1956 Sudanese pound was divided into 100 PT, each subdivided into 10 mms.

From 1958 to 1978 the pound was pegged to the U.S. dollar at a rate of US$2.87156 per LS 1. Thereafter, the pound underwent successive devaluations.

The pound was replaced in 1992 by the dinar (SDD) at a rate of SDD 1 = LS 10. While the dinar circulated in northern Sudan, in Southern Sudan prices were still negotiated in pounds; this ended with the establishment of the South Sudanese pound in 2011. In Rumbek and Yei, the Kenyan shilling was more widely accepted as payment.

=== Second pound (SDG) ===
The Comprehensive Peace Agreement between the government of the Republic of the Sudan and the Sudan People's Liberation Movement provided that the Central Bank of Sudan (CBOS) "shall adopt a program to issue a new currency as soon as is practical during the Interim Period. The design of the new currency shall reflect the cultural diversity of Sudan. Until a new currency has been issued with the approval of the Parties on the recommendations of the CBOS, the circulating currencies in Southern Sudan shall be recognised".

The second pound (SDG) was introduced on 9 or 10 January 2007, and became the only legal tender as of 1 July 2007. It replaced the dinar at a rate of LS 1 = SD 100 (or 1 SDG = 1,000 SDP).

=== Current Sudanese pound ===
Bag full of inflated Sudanese banknotes in 2022.

The third edition of the Sudanese pound was established on 24 July 2011 following the secession of South Sudan from the Republic of Sudan. The Sudanese pound was legal tender in South Sudan until 31 August 2011.

The Sudanese pound was devalued on 23 February 2021, with the official (indicative) exchange rate set to LS 375.08 per US dollar (from the previous fixed rate of LS 55), closing the gap between the commercial and black market exchange rates.

By July 2024, the Sudanese pound had depreciated to LS 2100 per US dollar in the parallel market.

== Coins ==
=== Local coinage in Sudan: issues of the Mahdi and Khalifa and of Darfur ===
In 1885, the Mahdi issued silver coins for 10 PT and 20 PT and gold 100 PT. These were followed by issues of the Khalifa in denominations of 10 para, 1 PT, 2 PT, 2 1/2 PT, 4 PT, 5 PT, 10 PT and 20 PT. These coins were initially minted in silver in 1885. Over the following eleven years, severe debasement occurred, leading to billon, then silver-washed copper and finally copper coins being issued. The coinage ceased in 1897.

During 1908–1914, a local coinage was issued in Darfur in western Sudan. These were issued under the authority of Ali Dinar and resembled contemporary Egyptian coins.

=== First pound ===
In 1956, coins were introduced in denominations of 1 mm, 2 mms, 5 mms and 10 mms, 2 PT, 5 PT and 10 PT. The millim denominations were struck in bronze, whilst the piastre denominations were in cupro-nickel. The 2 mms, 5 mms and 10 mms were scallop shaped, although a round 5 mms was introduced in 1971. The 1 mm and 2 mms were last struck in 1969, the last 5 millim in 1978. In 1983, brass 1 PT, 2 PT and 5 PT, a reduced size 10 PT and a cupro-nickel 20 PT were introduced. In 1987, aluminium-bronze 1 PT, 5 PT, 10 PT, 20 PT, 25 PT and 50 PT and LS 1 were introduced, with the 25 PT and 50 PT being square and octagonal in shape, respectively. In 1989, stainless-steel 25 PT and 50 PT and LS 1 were issued. This is the general pattern; in addition to these coins there are collector-oriented issues and various oddities. See popular coin catalogues for details.

=== Sudanese dinar ===
See Sudanese dinar.

=== Second pound ===
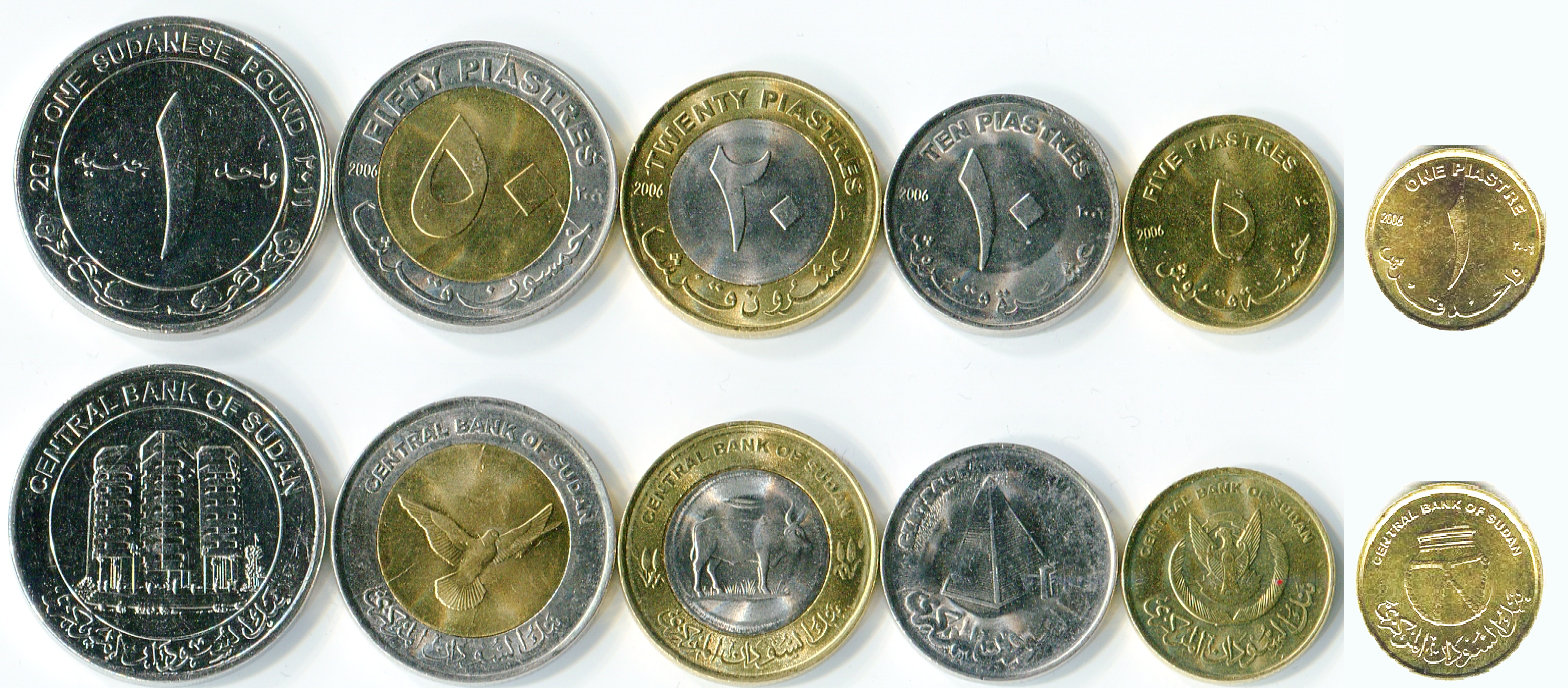
Sudanese coins (2011)

Coins in denominations of 1 PT, 5 PT, 10 PT, 20 PT and 50 PT were introduced alongside the circulating dinar coins. The Central Bank of Sudan states that the 5 PT coins are yellow coloured (perhaps aluminium-bronze) and the 10 PT is silver coloured (made of stainless steel). The 20 PT and 50 PT coins are bi-metallic, with the 20 PT yellow ringed with a silver coloured centre and the 50 PT the opposite.

== Banknotes ==
=== First pound ===
One-pound note, series 1987

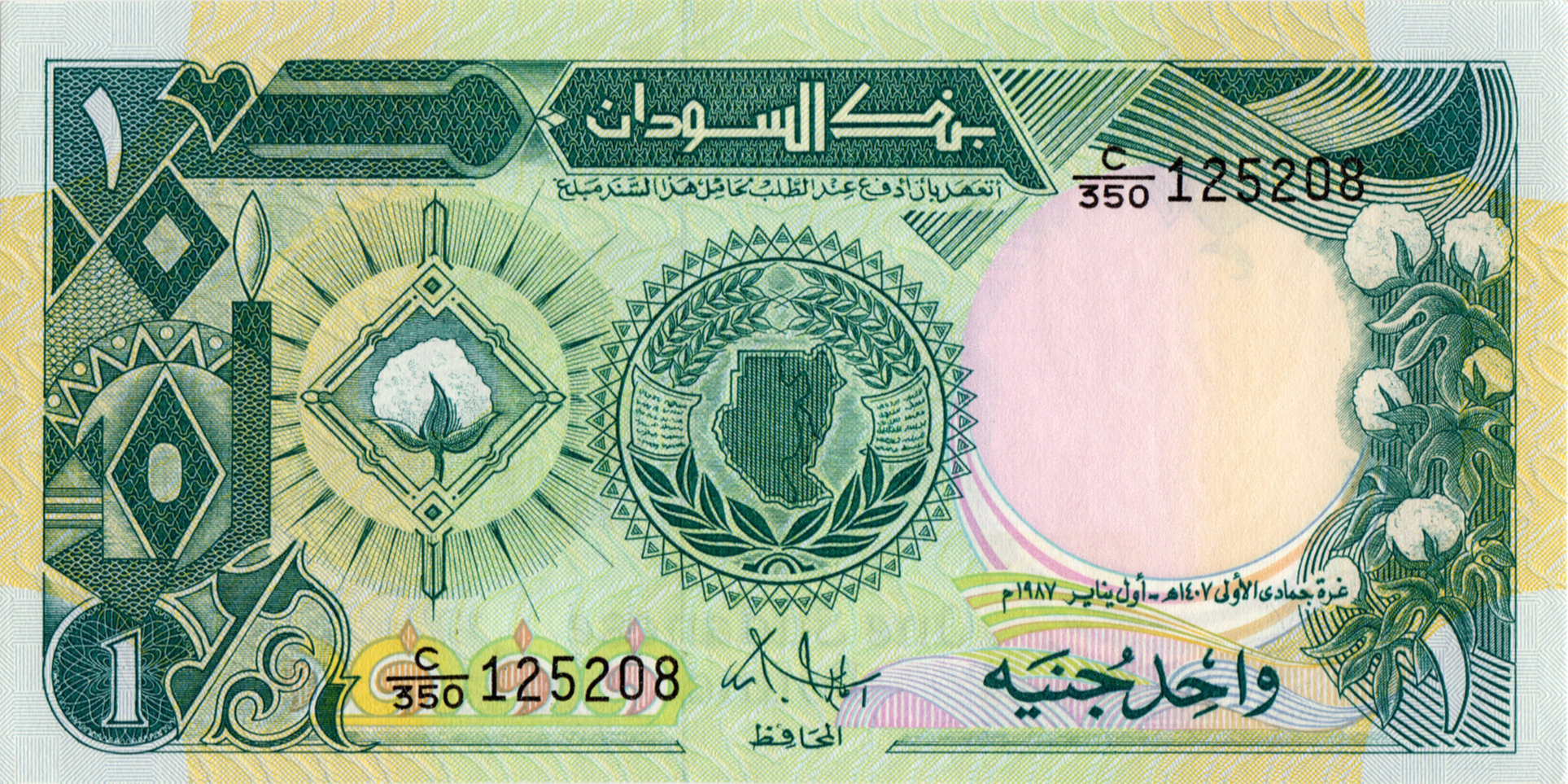
Obverse

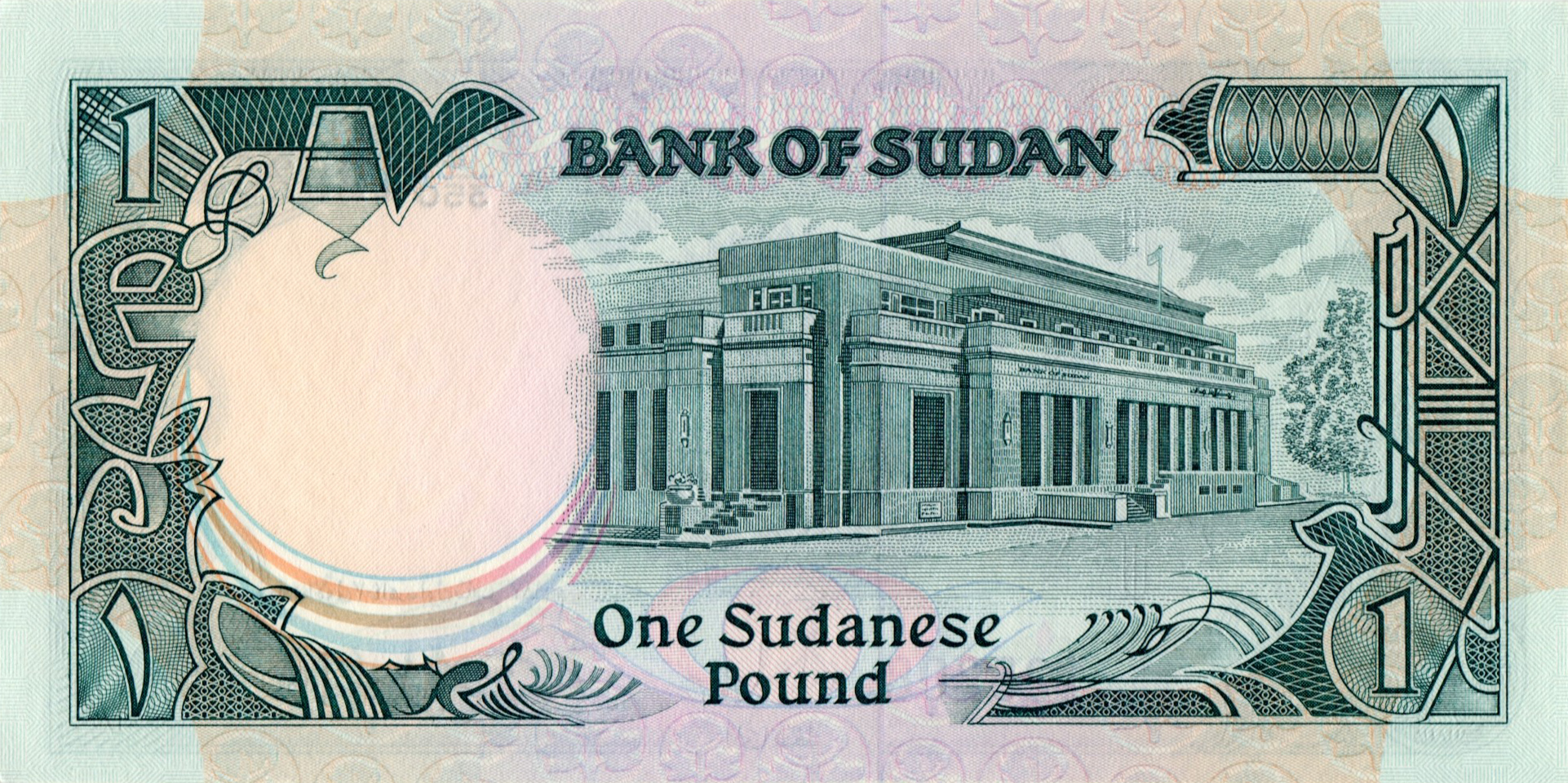
Reverse

In April 1957, the Sudan Currency Board introduced notes for 25 PT, 50 PT, LS 1, LS 5 and LS 10. Note production was taken over by the Bank of Sudan in 1961. LS 20 notes were introduced in 1981, followed by denominations of LS 50 in 1984 and LS 100 in 1988.

=== Sudanese dinar ===
When introduced on 8 June 1992, the Sudanese dinar replaced the first Sudanese pound at a rate of 1:10.

==== Questionable new notes ====
In 2005, the National Public Radio of the United States reported that forces in southern Sudan were printing pound notes bearing the name "Bank of New Sudan", but there is no such bank. In addition, numbers of the banknotes had duplicate serial numbers. Their legitimacy is questionable.

=== Second pound ===
When introduced on 10 January 2007, the second Sudanese pound replaced the Sudanese dinar at a rate of 1:100. This new currency was mandated by the 2005 Comprehensive Peace Agreement signed between the Sudanese government and the Sudan People's Liberation Movement to end the country's 21- year civil war. Deputy Governor Badr-Eddin Mahmoud said the cost to print the new currency was US$156 million. Banknotes of LS 1, LS 2, LS 5, LS 10, LS 20 and LS 50 were issued. The LS 1 note was replaced by a coin at the end of November 2011.

Banknotes of the Sudanese pound (2006 issue)
Image	Value	Obverse	Reverse	Watermark	Date of issue	Withdrawal
	LS 1	Central Bank of Sudan building, Khartoum; Pigeon	Pigeons	Pigeon and electrotype ℒ𝓈 1	9 July 2006	30 July 2026
	LS 2	Pottery	Musical instruments	Pigeon and electrotype ℒ𝓈 2	9 July 2006	30 July 2026
	LS 5	Ornate wall; satellite	Hydroelectric dam	Pigeon and electrotype ℒ𝓈 5	9 July 2006	30 July 2026
	LS 10	Tree in Tabaldia, clasped hands, watusi cattle, mountains, and camel	People's Palace, Khartoum	Secretary bird and electrotype ℒ𝓈 10	9 July 2006	30 July 2026
	LS 20	Machinery; oil derricks	Factory; radio antenna; fruit (bananas, papayas, flowers, pineapples, citrus, grapes, corn)	Secretary bird and electrotype ℒ𝓈 20	9 July 2006	30 July 2026
	LS 50	Wildlife (rhinoceros, elephants, ape in tree, water buffalo, zebras, and giraffe)	Sheep, cow, goat, camels	Secretary bird and electrotype ℒ𝓈 50	9 July 2006	30 July 2026

=== Current pound ===
Banknotes of the third pound are similar in style to those of the second pound but with changes in colour scheme, the removal of certain symbols associated with the south and a redrawn map of the country after the secession of the south.

Banknotes of the Sudanese pound (2011 Modified colors issue)
Image	Value	Obverse	Reverse	Date of issue	Withdrawal
	LS 2	Pottery	Musical instruments	June 2011	30 July 2026
	LS 5	Ornate wall; satellite	Hydroelectric dam	June 2011	30 July 2026
	LS 10	Tree in Tabaldia, clasped hands, mountains, and camel	People's Palace, Khartoum	June 2011	30 July 2026
	LS 20	Machinery; oil derricks	Factory; radio antenna; fruit (bananas, papayas, flowers, pineapples, citrus, grapes, corn)	June 2011	30 July 2026
	LS 50	Wildlife (rhinoceros, elephants, ape in tree, water buffalo, zebras, and giraffe)	Sheep, cow, goat, camels	June 2011	30 July 2026
	LS 50	Headquarters of the Central Bank of Sudan, standard gold bars of 400 oz. (12.4 kg), map of Sudan	Fishing boats, Camels	April 2018	30 July 2026
	LS 100	Pyramids of Meroë	Meroë hydroelectric dam	January 2019	Current
	LS 200	Wildlife	Red Sea underwater fauna	February 2019	Current
	LS 200	Modern building, huts	People with blackboard	August 2019	Current
	LS 500	Satellite dishes, National Telecommunications Corporation (NTC) Tower, Khartoum	Refinery	March 2019	Current
	LS 500	Tabo colossal statue; Presidential Palace building in Khartoum	Al-Mogran confluence of Blue Nile and White Nile in Khartoum	June 2024	Current
	LS 1,000	Sorghum plant, grain silos	Sorghum plant, waterfall, two farmers ploughing a field with cattle	June 2019	Current
	LS 1,000	Sanganeb lighthouse; grain silos and ship at Port Sudan	Bank of Sudan headquarters building in Khartoum	June 2025	Current
	LS 2,000	Camel, Goat, Cows, Bird	Kiosk of Naqa/Naga (Wadi Awareib)	June 2025	Current

==== New banknotes ====
On 1 January 2019, the Central Bank of Sudan (CBOS) announced that Sudanese pound banknotes of LS 100, LS 200 and LS 500 would be released that month, as the country grappled with a severe economic crisis and cash shortage.

The CBOS unveiled a new LS 100 banknote on 28 January 2019 by the Central Bank of Sudan.

The CBOS unveiled a new LS 200 banknote on 5 February 2019.

A new LS 500 banknote dated March 2019 was issued in 2019 and a LS 1,000 banknote dated June 2019 was issued on 7 June 2022.

Current SDG exchange rates
From Google Finance:	AUD CAD CHF CNY EUR GBP HKD JPY USD
From Yahoo! Finance:	AUD CAD CHF CNY EUR GBP HKD JPY USD
From XE.com:	AUD CAD CHF CNY EUR GBP HKD JPY USD
From OANDA:	AUD CAD CHF CNY EUR GBP HKD JPY USD

== See also ==
- British currency in the Middle East
- Economy of Sudan
- South Sudanese pound
- Egyptian pound

1st Sudanese pound
Preceded by: Egyptian pound Reason: independence (in 1956); Ratio: at par	Currency of Sudan; 1957 – 8 June 1992	Succeeded by: Sudanese dinar Location: Sudan; Reason: inflation Ratio: 1 dinar = 10 (1st) pounds	
Preceded by: Egyptian pound Reason: independence (in 1956); Ratio: at par	Currency of Sudan; 1957 – 8 June 1992	Currency of Southern Sudan; 1992 – January 2007; Note: see Second Sudanese Civil War	Succeeded by: 2nd Sudanese pound Location: Southern Sudan; Reason: currency unification (peace treaty); Ratio: 1 (2nd) pound = 1,000 (1st) pounds

2nd Sudanese pound
Preceded by: Sudanese dinar Location: Sudan; Reason: inflation and currency unification (peace treaty); Ratio: 1 (2nd) pound = 100 dinars	Currency of Sudan; January 2007 – 2011	Succeeded by: Third Sudanese pound Location: Sudan; Reason: independence of South Sudan; Ratio: at par Note: same ISO code with second pound
Preceded by: 1st Sudanese pound Location: Southern Sudan; Reason: currency unification (peace treaty); Ratio: 1 (2nd) pound = 1,000 (1st) pounds	Currency of Sudan; January 2007 – 2011	Succeeded by: South Sudanese pound Location: South Sudan; Reason: independence of South Sudan; Ratio: at par
