= Ministry of Federal Affairs (South Sudan) =

Government ministry of South Sudan

The Ministry of Federal Affairs of the Republic of South Sudan is a cabinet-level government ministry in the Transitional Government of National Unity (R-TGoNU), established to coordinate and facilitate enshrinement of federalism in the permanent constitution of the Republic of South Sudan.

The incumbent Minister of Federal Affairs is Lasuba L. Wongo.
