= Luka Tombekana Monoja =

South Sudanese politician

Luka Tombekana Monoja is a South Sudanese politician. He is the current Minister of Health in the Cabinet of South Sudan. He was appointed to that position on 10 July 2011.

== See also ==
- SPLM
- SPLA
- Cabinet of South Sudan
