= Muhammad ibn Abdallah =

Muhammad ibn Abdallah can refer to following people sharing this name:

- Muhammad ibn Abdullah ibn Abd al-Muttalib ibn Hashim, the full name of prophet Muhammad (c. 570–632)
- Al-Mahdi (745–785), the powerful Abbasid caliph of the Arab Caliphate from 775 to 785
- Muhammad ibn Abdallah al-Saffah, the son of Abbasid caliph al-Saffah
- Muhammad al-Nafs al-Zakiyya (d. 762), a descendant of Muhammad and a political figure in the early Islamic period
- Muhammad ibn al-Ma'mun, the son of Abbasid caliph al-Ma'mun and princess Umm Isa
- Muhammad ibn al-Mustakfi, (d. 970s) the 10th-century Abbasid prince and politician
- Muhammad ibn al-Qa'im, also known as Muhammad Dhakirat, the 11th-century Abbasid prince, son of caliph al-Qa'im and father of caliph al-Muqtadi
- Abu Nasr Muhammad ibn Abdallah al-Mustaʿsim (possibly died 1258), the thirteenth century Abbasid prince and son of last Abbasid caliph al-Musta'sim
- Mohammed ben Abdallah (d. 1790; also spelled "Mohammed ben Abdallah"), sultan of Morocco between 1757 and 1790
- Muhammad bin Abdullah Masjid, a mosque in Ayodhya, Uttar Pradesh, India
