= Ministry of Irrigation and Water Resources (South Sudan) =

Government ministry of South Sudan

South Sudan Ministry of Water Resources and Irrigation
Department overview
- Formed: 2011
- Jurisdiction: South Sudan
- Headquarters: Juba
- Minister responsible: Pal Mai Deng, Minister of Irrigation and Water Resources
- Website: https://mwri.gov.ss

Ministry of Water Resources and Irrigation is a ministry of the Government of South Sudan. The current minister is Hon. Pal Mai Deng, while Hon. Peter Mahal Dhieu Akat serves as undersecretary.

== List of ministers of irrigation and water resources ==
Minister	In office	Party	President	Note(s)
Paul Mayom Akec	Since July 2011	Sudan People's Liberation Movement	Salva Kiir	In office
