= Ministry of Labour, Public Service and Human Resource Development =

Government ministry of South Sudan

South Sudan Ministry of Labour, Public Service and Human Resource Development
Department overview
- Formed: 2011
- Jurisdiction: South Sudan
- Headquarters: Juba
- Minister responsible: Awut Deng Acuil, Minister of Labour, Public Service and Human Resource Development
- Website: mol.gov.ss

The Ministry of Labour, Public Service and Human Resource Development is a ministry of the Government of South Sudan. The incumbent minister is Awut Deng Acuil, while Kwong Danhier Gatluak serves as deputy minister.

== List of ministers of labour, public service and human resource development ==
Minister	In office	Party	President	Note(s)
Awut Deng Acuil	Since July 2011	Sudan People's Liberation Movement	Salva Kiir	In office
