= Economic history of Sudan =

This article discusses the economic history of Sudan.

== Colonial period ==
The colonial government was not interested in balanced economic growth. Instead, it concentrated its development efforts on irrigated agriculture and the railroad system throughout the Anglo-Egyptian Condominium (1899–1955). Incidental government investment went mainly into ad hoc projects, such as the construction of cotton gins and oilseed-pressing mills, as adjuncts of the irrigation program. A limited amount of rain-fed mechanized farming was also initiated during World War II.

After the war, two development programs—actually lists of proposed investments—were drawn up for the periods 1946–50 and 1951–55. These plans appear to have been a belated effort to broaden the country's economic base in preparation for eventual Sudanese independence. Both programs were seriously hampered by a lack of experienced personnel and materials and had little real impact. Independently, the private sector expanded irrigated agriculture, and some small manufacturing operations were started, but only three larger industrial enterprises (a meat-processing plant, a cement plant, and a brewery) were constructed, all between 1949 and 1952. The newly independent Sudan's principal development inheritance in 1956 thus was the vast irrigated Gezira Scheme and Sudan Railways.

== Postcolonial period ==
The new government did not attempt to prepare a national development plan until 1960. A Ten-Year Plan of Economic and Social Development for the fiscal years (FY) 1961–70 was drawn up for SDP565 million, at the time equivalent to more than US$1.6 billion. The private sector was expected to provide 40 percent of the amount. Unfortunately, the government had few experienced planners, and goals were overly ambitious. The plan as prepared was not adhered to. Implementation was by investment programs that were drawn up annually, and projects not in the original plan were frequently included. Investment was at a high rate in the first years, so that a number of major undertakings were completed by mid-plan, including the Khashm al-Qirbah and Manaqil irrigation projects and the Roseires Dam.

As the 1960s progressed, a lack of funds threatened the continuation of development activities. Government current expenditure had increased much faster than receipts, in part because of the intensification of the civil war in the South. At the same time, there was a shortfall in foreign investment capital. The substantial foreign reserves held at the beginning of the plan period were depleted, and the government resorted to deficit financing and foreign borrowing. By 1967, the Ten-Year Plan had been abandoned.

Late in the 1960s, the government prepared a new plan covering FY 1968 to FY 1972. That plan was discarded after the military coup led by Colonel Ja’far al-Numayri (in power, 1969–85) in May 1969. Instead, the government adopted the Five-Year Plan of Economic and Social Development (1970–74). That plan, which was prepared with the assistance of Soviet planning personnel, emphasized socialist development. After the end of the First Sudanese Civil War, in 1973 the government established the Interim Action Program, which extended the original plan period through FY 1976. New objectives included the removal of transportation bottlenecks, attainment of self-sufficiency in the production of several agricultural and industrial consumer items, and an increase in agricultural exports. Investment during the first five years was considerably above the original plan projection; however, the plan failed to achieve its goal of a 7.6 percent annual growth rate of gross domestic product, so it was extended to 1977. During the years of the Interim Action Program, the government initiated several irrigation projects, established factories on the Nile River northeast of Khartoum and on the White Nile south of Khartoum, paved the roads between Khartoum and Port Sudan, and began excavation in the South for the Jonglei Canal, also seen as Junqali Canal.

In early 1977, the government published the Six-Year Plan of Economic and Social Development, 1977–82. The plan goals and projections also appeared optimistic because of the worsening domestic economic situation, marked by growing inflation. The inflation stemmed in large part from deficit development financing (printing money), increasing development costs because of worldwide price rises, and rising costs for external capital. During the plan's second year, FY 1978, there was no economic growth, external debt pressures increased, and Sudan failed to meet its scheduled payments. The result was an abandonment of Six-Year Plan projections, a restriction of expenditures generally to the completion of projects under way, elimination of transport constraints, and a series of short-term “rolling” programs that emphasized exports.

In October 1983, the government announced a three-year public investment program, but efforts to Islamize the economy in 1984 impeded its implementation. Between 1978 and 1985, agricultural and industrial production declined in per-capita terms, and imports during much of the 1980s were three times the level of exports. After the al-Numayri government was overthrown in April 1985, the investment program was suspended.

An economic recovery program began in August 1987. This program was followed, beginning in October 1988, by a three-year recovery program to reform trade policy and regulate the exchange rate, reduce subsidies and the budget deficit, and encourage exports and privatization. The military government of Colonel Umar al-Bashir that took office on June 30, 1989, offered little possibility for early economic recovery. Foreign business interests viewed the government's policies to Islamize the banking system as a disincentive to do business in Sudan because no interest would be paid on new loans. Finally, the government did not satisfy the IMF or other major creditors that it had reduced subsidies on basic commodities enough to reduce its budget deficit. By 1991 the value of the Sudanese pound against the U.S. dollar had sunk to less than 10 percent of its 1978 value, and the country's external debt had risen to US$13 billion, the interest on which could be paid only by raising new loans.

Two reasons for the decline in production were the droughts and accompanying famine occurring in 1980–91, and the influx of more than 1 million refugees from Eritrea, Ethiopia, Chad, and Uganda. This was in addition to the persons displaced by the Second Sudanese Civil War, which had resumed in 1983, who were estimated to number between 1.5 million and 3.5 million. Nevertheless, the decline in Sudan's agricultural and industrial production had begun before these calamities. Few development projects were completed on time, and those that were completed failed to achieve projected production. Sudan found itself in a cycle of increasing debt and declining production.

Sudan borrowed heavily for its development programs over the years; then it suffered severely as international interest rates increased. During the 1990s, Sudan's relationship with the IMF became increasingly strained as a result of continuing debt arrears dating back to 1984. In 1997, when the IMF threatened to expel Sudan from the fund, the government revised its economic policies and established a comprehensive economic reform and structural adjustment program with the assistance of the IMF. The program, which continued, sought to stabilize the macroeconomic environment, reduce the rate of inflation, strengthen the external accounts, increase growth through privatization and deregulation, reform the banking sector, liberalize trade, and revise investment and foreign-exchange controls.

Although some aspects of the program, including privatization, have been disappointing, the IMF has praised the government for its adherence to the reform agenda. The IMF lifted its “non-cooperation” order in 1999 and restored Sudan's voting rights in 2000. The reform program has been credited with significant improvements in the economy. Inflation fell from triple digits to hover around 10 percent, the currency stabilized, foreign investment rose, and there were several years of economic growth. Nevertheless, there were still many problems to overcome, especially the impact of the previous civil war and the War in Darfur, which continued to place a heavy burden on government finances and undermine investor confidence, and the external debt arrears, which hindered access to new foreign funding.
