= Isaac Awan Maper =

South Sudanese politician

Isaac Awan Maper is a South Sudanese politician. He was the first Minister for the Environment in the Government of Southern Sudan and the caretaking government that followed immediately after the independence of South Sudan. He was a cabinet member in the government of President Salva Kiir that followed the general elections of April,2010.

Maper is a veteran politician and a former guerrilla fighter. He was an active member of the Anya-Anya I movement, the rebels who fought the first liberation war against the central government in Khartoum between 1955 and 1972. After the signing of the Addis Ababa peace agreement between the Anya-Anya movement and the then government of late dictator Gaafar Nimeiry, Hon. Maper was absorbed into the civil administration in Southern Sudan as a high ranking administrative officer. He served in that capacity for years and worked in different towns of South Sudan. Maper later joined politics and ran for elections to the then regional assembly of Southern Sudan based in Juba. He held several ministerial positions in the cabinet of the High Executive Council of Southern Sudan.

== See also ==
- SPLM
- SPLA
- Cabinet of South Sudan
