= Sudanese dinar =

Former currency of Sudan

دينار سوداني (Arabic)
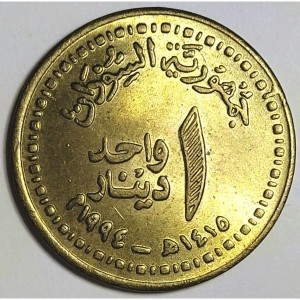
- 1-dinar coin

ISO 4217
- Code: SDD

Unit
- Symbol: SD

Denominations
- Banknotes
- Freq. used: SD 100, SD 200, SD 500, SD 1,000, SD 2,000, SD 5,000, SD 10,000
- Rarely used: SD 5, SD 10, SD 25, SD 50
- Coins: SD 1, SD 2, SD 5, SD 10, SD 20 and SD 50

Demographics
- Date of introduction: June 8, 1992
- Date of withdrawal: July 1, 2007
- User(s): None (previously Sudan)

Issuance
- Central bank: Bank of Sudan
- Website: www.bankofsudan.org

Valuation
- Inflation: 9%
- Source: The World Factbook, 2005 est.
- This infobox shows the latest status before this currency was rendered obsolete.

The dinar was the currency of Sudan between 1992 and 2007. Its ISO 4217 code was "SDD" and had no official subdivision. It replaced the first Sudanese pound and, in turn, was replaced by the second Sudanese pound.

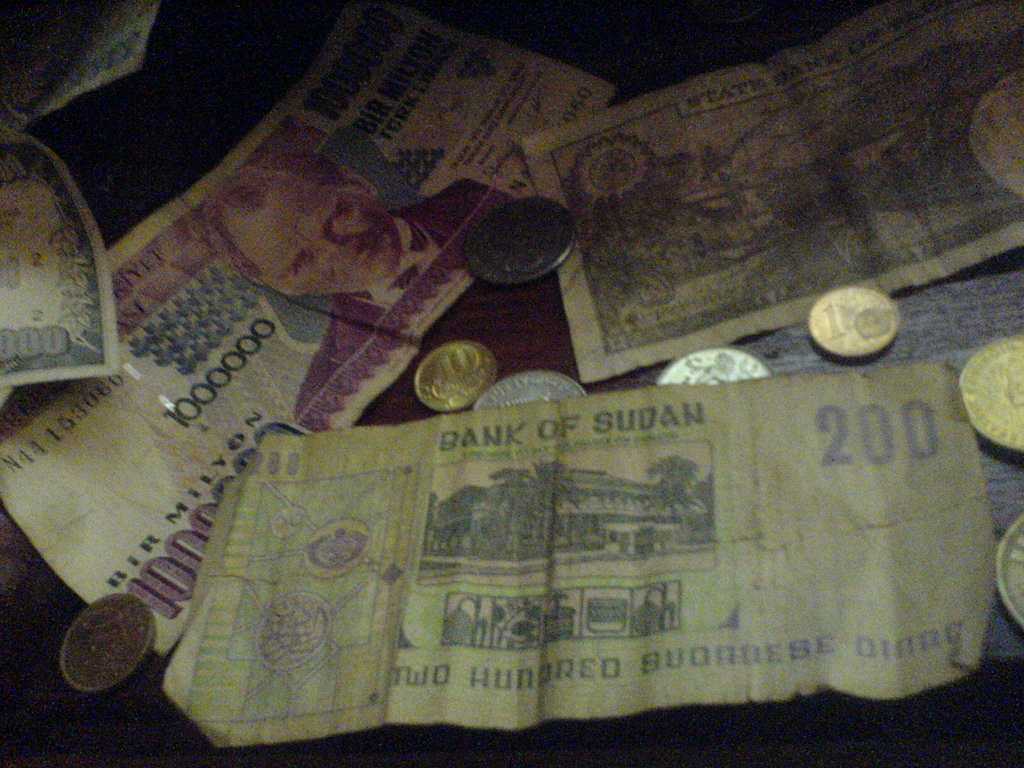
Various pieces of currency; a 200 SD note is in the foreground

== History ==
The dinar replaced the first Sudanese pound (SDP) on June 8, 1992, at a rate of SD 1 = £S.10. On January 10, 2007, a second Sudanese pound (SDG) was introduced at a rate of 1 pound = 100 dinars. According to the Bank of Sudan, the dinar was to have stopped circulating after a six-month transitional period. The pound and the dinar were to be accepted as legal currency side by side during the six-month period but cheques would be cashed in pounds from the commercial banks. The Bank of Sudan began distributing the new currency to commercial banks and sent consignments of banknotes to the south in 2007. This second Sudanese pound became the only legal tender as of July 1, 2007.

== Coins ==
Coins were minted in denominations of SD 1/4, SD 1/2, SD 1, SD 2, SD 5, SD 10, SD 20 and SD 50 (the two smallest denominations appear to have been shelved before being issued). A reduction in size took place, with the 2001-03 coins being generally smaller than the 1994-99 coins. A source indicates that bi-metallic SD 50 and SD 100 coins were planned but that this plan was shelved because of the introduction of the second pound. See below for more detail.

== Banknotes ==
Banknotes were issued in denominations of SD 5, SD 10, SD 25, SD 50, SD 100, SD 200, SD 500, SD 1,000, SD 2,000 and SD 5,000. The lowest three denominations were withdrawn on 1 January 2000 due to a concern that well-used notes could spread disease. Old pound notes also circulated alongside dinar notes.

== Historical exchange rates ==
Rate against US$1995–2004. (See historical rates)

== See also ==
- Economy of Sudan

Preceded by: 1st Sudanese pound Reason: inflation Ratio: 1 dinar = 10 (1st) pounds	Currency of Northern Sudan; 1992 – January, 2007	Succeeded by: 2nd Sudanese pound Reason: inflation and currency unification (peace treaty); Ratio: 1 (2nd) dinar = 100 piastres
