= Ministry of Commerce, Industry and Investment (South Sudan) =

Government ministry of South Sudan

South Sudan Ministry of Investment
Department overview
- Formed: 2011
- Jurisdiction: South Sudan
- Headquarters: Juba
- Minister responsible: Dr Dhieu Mathok, Minister of Investment

The Ministry of Investment is a ministry of the Government of South Sudan. The incumbent minister is Dr Dhieu Mathok.

== List of ministers of trade, industry and East Africa Community affairs ==
#	Name	Office		Party
1	Garang Diing Akuong	2011	2011	Sudan People's Liberation Movement
2	Barnaba Marial Benjamin	2011	2011	Sudan People's Liberation Movement
3	Garang Diing Akuong	August 7, 2011	February 23, 2015	Sudan People's Liberation Movement
4	Akec Khoc Aciew Khoc	February 23, 2015	February 23, 2015	Sudan People's Liberation Movement
5	Dr. Barnaba Marial Benjamin	February 23, 2015	February 27, 2015	Sudan People's Liberation Movement
6	Joseph Bangasi Bakosoro	2015	2015	Sudan People's Liberation Movement
7	Beatrice Wani-Noah	2015	2016	Sudan People's Liberation Movement
8	Martin Elia Lomuro	2016	2016	Sudan People's Liberation Movement
9	Deng Alor Kuol	2016	2016	Sudan People's Liberation Movement
10	Dr Moses Hassen Tiel	2016	2016	Sudan People's Liberation Movement
11	Paul Mayom Akech	2016	2016	Sudan People's Liberation Movement
12	Nhial Deng Nhial	2016	2017	Sudan People's Liberation Movement
13	Awut Deng Acuil	2017		Sudan People's Liberation Movement

== See also ==
Ministry of Trade, Industry and East Africa Community Affairs (South Sudan)
