= Lasuba L. Wango =

South Sudanese politician

Minister of Federal Affairs
- Incumbent
- Assumed office 12 March 2020
- President: Salva Kiir

Personal details
- Party: SPLM-IO

Lasuba L. Wango is a South Sudanese politician who has served in the Cabinet of South Sudan as the Minister of Federal Affairs since 12 March 2020. A member of the Sudan People's Liberation Movement-in-Opposition party, Wango was appointed to the position as part of a power-sharing agreement which concluded the South Sudanese Civil War. In this position, Wango has overseen South Sudan's transition towards federalism.

In June 2025, President Salva Kiir appointed him deputy chair of the reconstituted High-Level Ad Hoc Committee on the Implementation of the Revitalized Agreement on the Resolution of the Conflict in South Sudan, a peace process commission.
