= 1997 Labour Code =

Employment law in Sudan

The 1997 Labour Code is a Sudanese law regulating employment. It replaced the Manpower Act of 1974.

It sets forth the organization of employment (including provisions for women and juveniles), contracts of service, wages, working hours and leave, termination of employment, after-service benefits, and miscellaneous other provisions. It also lists categories of persons who are exempt from the act, among them domestic servants, agricultural workers other than persons employed in establishments that process agricultural products, and casual workers.
