= David Deng Athorbei =

South Sudanese politician (born c. 1949)

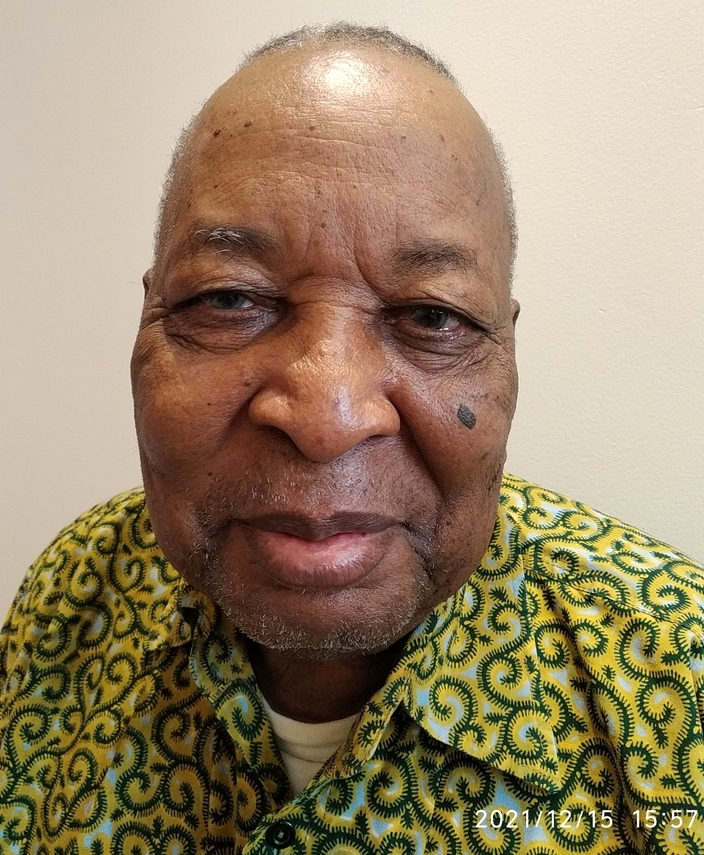
- David Deng Athorbei in 2021

Minister of Electricity and Dams
- In office 2016–2020

Minister of Finance
- In office 31 May 2009 – 26 August 2011
- President: Salva Kiir
- Preceded by: Koul Athian Mawien
- Succeeded by: Kosti Manibe Ngai
- In office 12 January 2015 – 28 April 2016
- Preceded by: Aggrey Tisa Sabuni
- Succeeded by: Stephen Dhieu Dau

Personal details
- Party: SPLM

David Deng Athorbei (c. 1949 near Yirol, Lakes State), also sometimes wrongly referred to as David Deng Athorbie, is a South Sudanese politician and civil servant. Presently he is a member of parliament representing Yirol West. He has been Minister for Finance and Economic Planning, Minister of Roads, and Minister of Electricity and Dams in independent South Sudan.

== Background ==
David Deng Athorbei is born in 1949 (officially estimated age) in a village near the town of Yirol. Lakes State. He is a member of the Dinka ethnic group. He started his secondary school education in Rumbek, but completed it in Khartoum. He studied Business Administration at the University of Khartoum and received his Bachelor of Science in Business Administration (BSBA) in 1973. While working for the local government offices of Upper Nile province and Bahr El Ghazal province, he followed diploma courses at the University of Birmingham (Development Administration, 1979) and the University of Manchester (Local Planning, 1984). From 1987 to 1989 he worked for the relief organization Band Aid of Bob Geldof at their Khartoum office. As of mid 1989 David Deng Athorbei worked for the UNDP in Ethiopia for one year, after which he joined the SPLM.

== Civil servant during the Government of Southern Sudan ==
After the signing of the Comprehensive Peace Agreement in 2005 in Nairobi which ended the Second Sudanese Civil War and established the semi-autonomous Government of Southern Sudan in Juba, David Athorbei has been Minister of Labour, Public Service & Human Resource Development (2005–2007), Minister of Transport and Roads (2007–2009), and Minister of Finance and Economic Planning (2009–2011). At the end of the latter period David Deng Athorbei printed the new South Sudanese currency, the South Sudanese Pound, which carries his signature as the Minister of Finance, and which was introduced shortly after independence of South Sudan.

== Civil servant and politician in an Independent South Sudan ==
Directly after independence of South Sudan on 9 July 2011, David Deng Athorbei continued as Minister of Finance and Economic Planning for two months (July - August), after which he continued as the Minister of Electricity and Dams, 2011–2012. From 2015–2016 he was Minister of Finance. From 2016 to 2020 he was again the Minister of Electricity and Dams.

David Deng Athorbei is a Member of Parliament for Yirol West county since 9 July 2011.
