= Central Bank of Sudan =

Sudan government body that manages currency and monetary policy

Coordinates: 15°36′15″N 32°30′15″E

Central Bank of Sudan (CBOS) بنك السودان المركزي

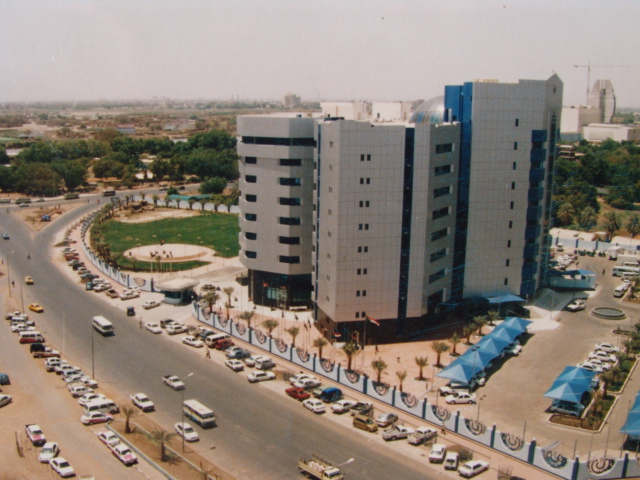
- Central Bank of Sudan main branch in Khartoum
- Central bank of: Sudan
- Headquarters: Al Jamhoria Street, Khartoum
- Established: 22 February 1960
- Dissolved: April 2023
- Ownership: 100% state ownership
- Governor: Amna Mirghani Hassan al-Toum
- Currency: Sudanese pound SDG (ISO 4217)
- Website: cbos.gov.sd

The Central Bank of Sudan (Arabic: بنك السودان المركزي) is the central bank of Sudan. The bank was formed in 1960, four years after Sudan's independence. It is located in the capital Khartoum. In April 2023, the Central Bank's headquarters was destroyed during the Sudanese civil war (2023-present).

== History ==
When Sudan achieved independence in 1956, the creation of workable monetary arrangements was a priority. The new government first established a currency board, the Sudan Currency Board, in 1957. A 3-man commission of experts from the United States's Federal Reserve then worked with Sudanese government and finance specialists to create the Law of the Bank of Sudan for 1959, and in 1960 the Bank of Sudan began operations. To establish the bank, the Sudanese government nationalized the National Bank of Egypt's operations in the Sudan (some seven branches), and combined them with the Sudanese currency board.

In addition to the normal duties of a central bank, which may include minting coins and issuing banknotes, managing a country's internal and external accounting, and setting monetary policy and interest rates, Sudan's central bank is also responsible for fostering Islamic banking.

After Sudan introduced Islamic law (Sharia) in 1984, the banking and financial industry changed its practices to conform with Sharia. In 1993 the government established the Sharia High Supervisory Board (SHSB) to ensure compatibility of financial practices with Islamic principles. In compliance with the SHSB, the government is no longer selling treasury bills and government bonds; instead, the Bank sells "Financial Certificates" that comply with Islamic financial principles.

=== Banking history ===
In 1965, Bank of Sudan and Crédit Lyonnais formed a joint-venture bank named Al/An/El Nilein Bank (Nile Bank). Crédit Lyonnais contributed the two branches it had developed since it first entered Sudan in 1953. Bank of Sudan took 60 percent of the shares in Nilein Bank, and Crédit Lyonnais took 40 percent.

In 1970, the Sudanese government nationalized all the banks in the Sudan, changed the names of several, and put them under the Bank of Sudan. Barclays Bank, which had an extensive network of 24 branches, became the State Bank of Foreign Trade, and then Bank of Khartoum. The six branches of Egypt's Bank Misr became People's Cooperative Bank. The four branches of Jordan's Arab Bank became Red Sea Bank or Red Sea Commercial Bank (accounts differ). Commercial Bank of Ethiopia's one branch became Juba Commercial Bank. National and Grindlays Bank, which in 1969 had taken over the four branches that Ottoman Bank had established after it entered in 1949, became Omdurman Bank. In 1973 Red Sea Bank and People's Cooperative Bank were merged into Omdurman Bank. Then in 1984 Omdurman Bank merged with the Juba Commercial Bank to form Unity Bank.

In 1993, Al/An/El Nilein Bank merged with the Industrial Bank of Sudan to form Nilein Industrial Development Bank. In 2006, Dubai-based Emaar Properties and Amlak Finance acquired a 60% stake in Sudan’s El Nilein Industrial Development Bank; the Bank of Sudan retained a 40% stake.

== Operations ==
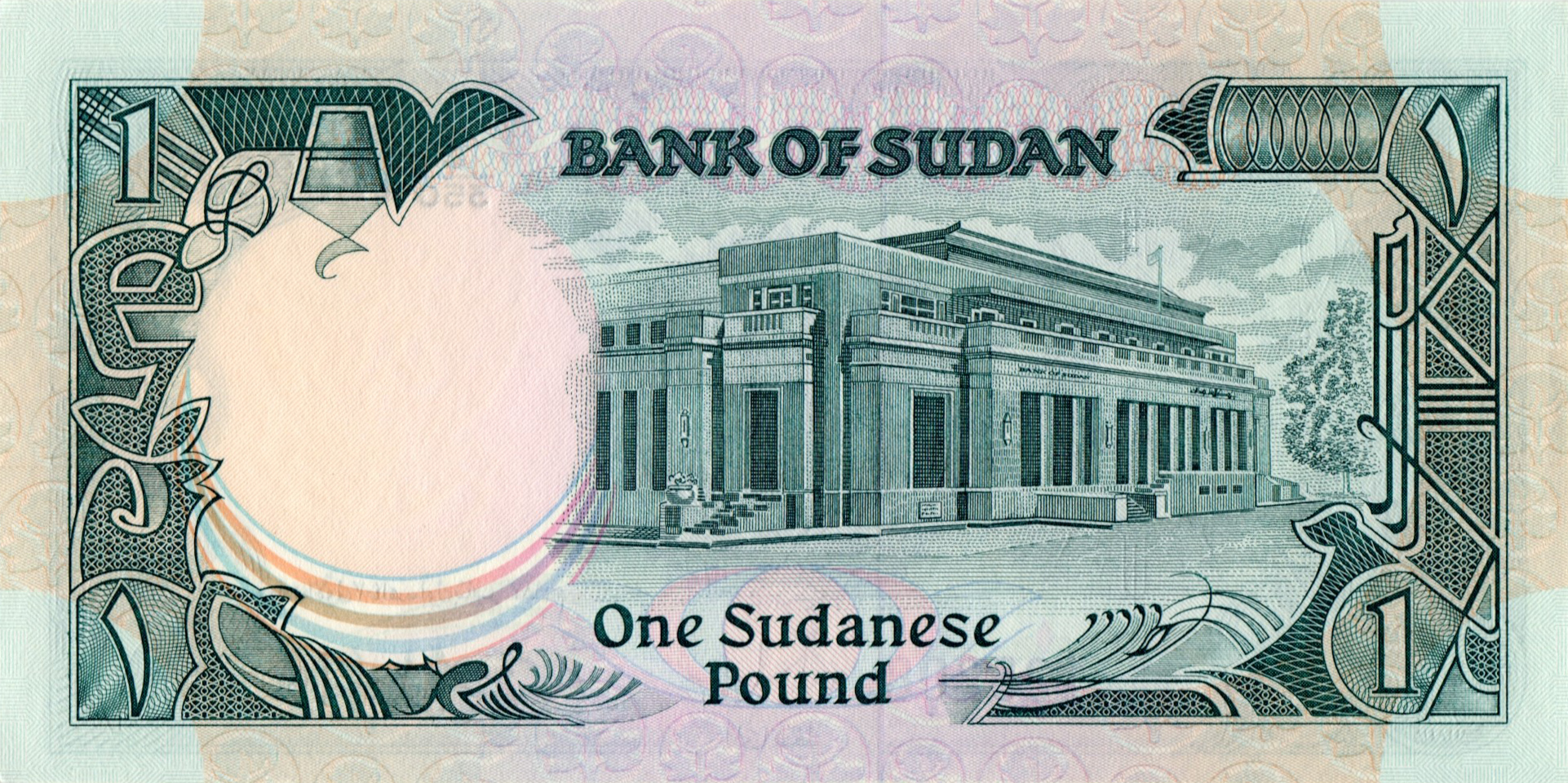
Reverse of a series 1987 one-pound banknote featuring the bank's headquarters

As far as the current state of the Sudanese banking and financial situation is concerned, the bank's "About Bank of Sudan" section states. Since the beginning of the Three Year Economic Program (1990–1993), the Bank of Sudan has carried out policies that aim to revitalize the Sudanese economy, the last of which was the credit policy of 2000 which was based on the following:

1. Emphasizing supply side measures and monetary stability better to utilize banking resources by stressing financing of priority economic priority sectors, and continuation of streamlining general supply policies.
2. Continuation of the social support program for the benefit of the poor families in accordance with the national mobilization project for social security and for the improvement of productivity.
3. Continuation of financing public corporations through the banks without recourse to the Bank of Sudan for direct financing.
4. Allowing the commercial banks to offer financing in foreign exchange according to the regulations issued by the Bank of Sudan.

=== Financial inclusion ===
The Bank is engaged in developing policies to promote financial inclusion and is a member of the Alliance for Financial Inclusion.

=== Branches of the Central Bank of Sudan ===
As Sudan is one of the biggest countries in Africa, the central bank has a branch bank system. After independence of South Sudan in 2011, the former branch in the new capital of South Sudan, Juba, became the Central Bank of South Sudan.

- The Main Branch — Khartoum
- Wad Madani Branch
- Kosti Branch
- Atbara Branch
- Al Qadarif Branch
- Nyala Branch
- Al-Ubayyid Branch
- Dongola Branch
- Port Sudan Branch
- Al-Fashir Branch
- Wau Branch

=== List of governors of the Central Bank of Sudan ===
- Mamoun Beheiry (1959–1963)
- Elsayid Elfeel (1964–1967)
- Abdelrahim Mayrgani (1967–1970)
- Abdelateef Hassan (1970–1971)
- Awad Abdel Magied Aburiesh (1971–1972)
- Ibrahim Mohammed Ali Nimir (1973–1980)
- Elsheikh Hassan Belail (1980–1983)
- Faroug Ibrahim Elmagbool (1983–1985)
- Ismail el-misbah Mekki hamad (1985–1988)
- Mahdi Elfaky Elshaikh (1988–1990)
- Elshaik SidAhmed Elshaikh (1990–1993)
- Sabir Mohammed El-Hassan (1993–1996)
- Abdall Hassan Ahmed (1996–1998)
- Sabir Mohammed El-Hassan (1998-2011)
- Mohamed Kheir El-Zubeir (March 2011 – December 2013)
- Abdelrahman Hassan Abdelrahman Hashim (December 2013 – December 2016)
- Hazim Abdegadir Ahmed Babiker (December 2016 – June 2018)
- Mohamed Kheir El-Zubeir (September 2018 – March 2019)
- Hussein Yahya Jangoul al-Basha (March 2019 – December 2019)
- Mohamed Elfatih Zein al-Abdein (March 2020 – February 2022)
- Hussein Yahya Jangoul al-Basha (February 2022 – May 2023)
- Burai Al-Siddiq Ahmed (May 2023 - October 2025)
- Amna Mirghani Hassan al-Toum (October 2025 - present)

== Sudanese civil war (2023-present) ==
During the Sudanese civil war (2023-present), the Sudanese economy and banking sector have been suffering wide-ranging disruptions, with damages estimated at 4 billion USD. On 16 June 2023, the Central Bank of Sudan announced emergency measures to sustain the banking sector, including payment of salaries and the provision of cash flow for citizens.

Furthermore, a rocket attack was carried out at a branch of the Central Bank in Khartoum by the Rapid Support Forces, on 30 April 2023 during the conflict. Due to the fog of war, no civilian injuries or deaths have been confirmed yet. As a result of the impact, most of the building was shown on fire, having possibly collapsed. In May 2023 it was reported the Sudanese Armed Forces (SAF) had been bombing the central bank in order for the RSF not to print money. On 22 March 2025, the SAF retook the bank's headquarters in Khartoum from the RSF.

In September 2025, the central bank declared a ban on the exportation of gold by the private sector as part of efforts to combat smuggling and preserve foreign currency reserves. In October 2025, Sudan's military leader General Abdel Fattah al-Burhan appointed Amna Mirghani Hassan al-Toum as governor of the central bank, making her the first woman to hold the position.

In January 2026, the central bank resumed its operations in Khartoum.

== See also ==
- Sudanese pound
- Sudanese dinar
- Economy of Sudan
- List of central banks of Africa
- List of central banks
