= Cabinet of South Sudan =

Executive Branch of the Government of South Sudan

The Cabinet of South Sudan is the Executive Branch of the Government of South Sudan. The Cabinet members are appointed by the President and report to the President.

== Revitalized Transitional Government of National Unity (RTGoNU) ==
Under the terms of the Revitalized Agreement on the Resolution of the Conflict in the Republic of South Sudan (R-ARCSS), that came into effect on 22 February 2020, South Sudan is governed by a Revitalized Transitional Government of National Unity (RTGoNU) led by a cabinet of 35 members. Under the terms of the agreement, SPLM nominated 20 ministers, SPLM-IO nominated nine ministers, South Sudan Opposition Alliance (SSOA) nominated 3, former detainees nominated 2 and the remaining minister was nominated by other parties to the agreement.

=== List of ministers ===
A Revitalized Transitional Government of National Unity (RTGoNU), made up of 35 ministers and 10 deputy ministers, was appointed on 12 March 2020. The cabinet was reshuffled on 10 February 2025. The members were:

Ministry	Incumbent
President of South Sudan	Salva Kiir (SPLM)
Vice Presidents of South Sudan	Riek Machar (SPLM-IO)
Vice Presidents of South Sudan	Benjamin Bol Mel (SPLM)
Vice Presidents of South Sudan	Taban Deng Gai (SPLM-IO)
Vice Presidents of South Sudan	Rebecca Nyandeng (Former Detainees)
Vice Presidents of South Sudan	Josephine Joseph Lagu (SSOA)
Minister of Presidential Affairs	Africano Mande Gedima
Minister of Agriculture and Forestry	Hussein Abdelbagi
Minister of Livestock and Fisheries	Onyoti Adigo Nyikec
Minister of Cabinet Affairs	Martin Elia Lomuro
Minister of Investment	Joseph Mum Majak
Minister Youth and Sports	Mary Nawai Martin
Minister of Defence and Veterans Affairs	Clement Juma
Minister of East African Affairs	Pieng Deng Kuol
Minister of Energy and Dams	Agor Makur Kur
Minister of Environment and Forestry	Mabior Garang De-Mabior
Minister of Federal Affairs	Lasuba Loduro Wango
Minister of Finance and Economic Planning	Kuol Daniel Ayulo
Minister of Foreign Affairs and International Cooperation	James Pitia Morgan
Minister of Gender and Social Welfare	Nuna Rhoda Rudolf
Minister of General Education and Instruction	Kuyok Abol Kuyok
Minister of Health	Sarah Cleto Rial
Minister of Higher Education, Science and Technology	Madut Biar Yel
Minister of Land, Housing and Urban Development	Michael Chanjiek Geay
Minister of Humanitarian Affairs	Albino Akol Atak
Minister of Information, Communication Technology and Postal Services	Ateny Wek Ateny
Minister of Interior	Aleu Ayieny Aleu
Minister of Water Resources and Irrigation	James Mawich Makuac
Minister of Justice and Constitutional Affairs	Joseph Geng Akec
Minister of Labour	James Hoth Mai
Minister of Petroleum	Puot Kang Chol (Suspended)
Minister of National Security	Obuto Mamur Mete
Minister of Parliamentary Affairs	Wek Mamer Kuol
Minister of Culture, Museums and National Heritage	Sarah Nyanath Elijah Yong
Minister of Peace Building	Stephen Parl Kuol (Suspended)
Minister of Public Service and Human Resource Development	Mahjoub Biel Turuk
Ministry of Trade and Industry	Atong Kuol Manyang
Minister of Mining	Losuba Ludoru Wongo
Minister of Roads and Bridges	Lam Both
Minister of Transport	Lam Akol Ajawin
Minister of Wildlife, Conservation and Tourism	Denay Jock Chagor

== Pre-2020 cabinet ==
Ministry	Incumbent
President of South Sudan	Salva Kiir
First Vice President of South Sudan	Taban Deng Gai
Vice President of South Sudan	James Wani Igga
Minister in the Office of the President	Mayiik Ayii Deng
Minister of Agriculture and Forestry	Onyoti Adigo Nyikwec
Minister of Animal Resources and Fisheries	James Janka Duku
Minister of Cabinet Affairs	Martin Elia Lomuro
Minister of Commerce, Industry and Investment	Paul Mayom Akec
Minister of Culture, Youth and Sports	Dr. Nadia Arop Dudi
Minister of Defence and Veterans Affairs	Gen. Kuol Manyang Juuk
Minister of Electricity and Dams	Dr. Dhieu Mathok Diing
Minister of Environment	Josephine Napon
Minister of Finance and Economic Planning	Salvatore Garang Mabiordit
Minister of Foreign Affairs and International Cooperation	Awut Deng Acuil
Minister of Gender, Social Welfare and Religious Affairs	Agnes Kwaje Lasuba
Minister of General Education and Instruction	Deng Deng Hoc
Minister of Health	Dr. Riak Gai Kok
Minister of Higher Education, Science and Technology	Yen Oral Lam
Minister of Housing, Physical Planning and Environment	Dr Lado Gore
Minister of Humanitarian Affairs and Disaster Management	Hussein Maar Nyot
Ministry of Information, Communication Technology and Postal Services	Michael Makuei Lueth
Minister of Internal Affairs	Micheal Chiengjiek
Minister of Irrigation and Water Resources	Sophia Pal Gai
Minister of Justice	Paulino Wanawilla
Minister of Labour, Public Service and Human Resource Development	James Hoth Mai
Minister of National Security	Gen. Obuto Mamur Mete
Minister of Parliamentary Affairs	Peter Bashir Bande
Minister of Petroleum and Mining	Ezekiel Lul Gatkuoth
Minister of Roads and Bridges	Rebecca Joshua Okwaci
Minister of Transport and Roads	John Luk Jok
Minister of Wildlife Conservation and Tourism	Jemma Nunu Kumba

== See also ==
- South Sudan
- Government of South Sudan
- Economy of South Sudan
- Education in South Sudan
