= Ministry of Animal Resources and Fisheries (South Sudan) =

Government ministry of South Sudan

South Sudan Ministry of Animal Resources and Fisheries
Department overview
- Formed: 2011
- Jurisdiction: South Sudan
- Headquarters: Juba
- Minister responsible: Onyoti Adigo Nyikec, Minister of Animal Resources and Fisheries

The Ministry of Animal Resources and Fisheries is now the called the Ministry of Livestock and Fisheries in the newly formed government of national unity. This ministry was renamed following the formation of Transitional Government of national Unity in 2020. The ministry livestock and fisheries is now the national ministry of the Government of South Sudan. The incumbent minister is Onyeti Adigo Nyikech as per 2022.

== List of ministers of animal resources and fisheries ==
#	Name	Office		Party	President
1	Nyaluk T. Gatluak	2011	2011	Sudan People's Liberation Movement	Salva Kiir
2	Martin Elia Lomuro	2011	2012	Sudan People's Liberation Movement	Salva Kiir
3	Nadia Arop Dudi	2012	2012	Sudan People's Liberation Movement	Salva Kiir
4	John Luk Jok	2012	2012	Sudan People's Liberation Movement	Salva Kiir
5	Josephine Napon	2012	2013	Sudan People's Liberation Movement	Salva Kiir
6	Michael Makuei Lueth	2013	2014	Sudan People's Liberation Movement	Salva Kiir
7	Jemma Nunu Kumba	2014	2015	Sudan People's Liberation Movement	Salva Kiir
8	Rebecca Joshua Okwaci	2015	2016	Sudan People's Liberation Movement	Salva Kiir
9	Martin Elia Lomuro	2016	2016	Sudan People's Liberation Movement	Salva Kiir
10	Hon. James Janga Duku	2016	2017	Sudan People's Liberation Movement	Salva Kiir
11	Peter Bashir Bande	2017	2017	Sudan People's Liberation Movement	Salva Kiir
12	Hon. James Janga Duku	2017		Sudan People's Liberation Movement	Salva Kiir
13	Onyoti Adigo Nyikec	2020	Incumbent	SPLA-IO	Salva Kiir
