= Ministry of Gender, Social Welfare and Religious Affairs =

Government ministry of South Sudan

South Sudan Ministry of Gender, Social Welfare and Religious Affairs
Department overview
- Formed: 2005
- Jurisdiction: South Sudan
- Headquarters: Juba
- Minister responsible: Agnes Kwaje Lasuba, Minister of Gender, Social Welfare and Religious Affairs

The Ministry of Gender, Social Welfare and Religious Affairs is a ministry of the Government of South Sudan. The incumbent minister is Agnes Kwaje Lasuba, while Priscilla Nyangyang Joseph serves as deputy minister.

== List of Ministers of Gender, Social Welfare and Religious Affairs ==
| # | Name | Office | | Party |
|---|---|---|---|---|
| 1 | Deng Alor Koul | 2005 | 2010 | |
| — | Agnes Kwaje Lasuba | 2010 | 2011 | |
| 2 | Martin Elia Lomuro | 2011 | 2011 | Sudan People's Liberation Movement |
| 3 | Nadia Arop Dudi | 2011 | 2011 | Sudan People's Liberation Movement |
| 3 | John Luk Jok | 2012 | 2012 | Sudan People's Liberation Movement |
| 4 | Josephine Napon | 2012 | 2013 | Sudan People's Liberation Movement |
| 5 | Michael Makuei Lueth | 2013 | 2014 | Sudan People's Liberation Movement |
| 6 | Jemma Nunu Kumba | 2014 | 2015 | Sudan People's Liberation Movement |
| 7 | Rebecca Joshua Okwaci | 2015 | 2016 | Sudan People's Liberation Movement |
| 8 | Deng Deng Akoon | 2016 | 2016 | Sudan People's Liberation Movement |
| 9 | Hon. James Janga Duku | 2016 | 2017 | Sudan People's Liberation Movement |
| 10 | Peter Bashir Bande | 2017 | 2017 | Sudan People's Liberation Movement |
| 11 | Beatrice Kamisa Wani | 2017 | 2018 | Sudan People's Liberation Movement |
| 12 | Angelina Teny | 2018 | 2018 | Sudan People's Liberation Movement |
| 13 | Pagan Amum | 2018 | 2018 | Sudan People's Liberation Movement |
| 14 | Salva Kiir | 2018 | 2019 | Sudan People's Liberation Movement |
| 15 | Joseph Malek Arok | 2019 | 2019 | Sudan People's Liberation Movement |
| 16 | Agnes Kwaje Lasuba | 2019 | | Sudan People's Liberation Movement |
