= Ministry of Transport and Roads =

Government ministry of South Sudan

South Sudan Ministry of Transport and Roads
Department overview
- Formed: 2011
- Jurisdiction: South Sudan
- Headquarters: Juba
- Minister responsible: Riek Machar, Minister of Transport and Roads

The Ministry of Transport and Roads is a ministry of the Government of South Sudan. The incumbent minister is Agnes Poni Lokudu, while Mayom Kuoc Malek serves as deputy minister.

== List of ministers of transport and roads ==
N	Minister	In office		Party	President
	Agnes Poni Lokudu	9 July 2011	2013	Sudan People's Liberation Movement	Salva Kiir
	Jemma Nunu Kumba	2013	2013	Sudan People's Liberation Movement	Salva Kiir
	Gabriel Changson Chang	2013	2014	Sudan People's Liberation Movement	Salva Kiir
	Agnes Poni Lokudu	2014	2015	Sudan People's Liberation Movement	Salva Kiir
	Betty Ogwaro	2015	2015	Sudan People's Liberation Movement	Salva Kiir
	Agnes Poni Lokudu	2015	2017	Sudan People's Liberation Movement	Salva Kiir
	Ezekiel Lol Gatkuoth	2017	2019	Sudan People's Liberation Movement	Salva Kiir
	Michael Roberto Kenyi	2019	2019	Sudan People's Liberation Movement	Salva Kiir
	Agnes Poni Lokudu	2019	2019	Sudan People's Liberation Movement	Salva Kiir
	John Luk Jok	2019	2020	Sudan People's Liberation Movement	Salva Kiir
	Mayiik Ayii Deng	2020	2020	Sudan People's Liberation Movement	Salva Kiir
	Rizik Zackaria Hassan	2025	Incumbent	Sudan People's Liberation Movement	Salva Kiir

== See also ==
- Ministry of Roads and Bridges (South Sudan)
