= Ministry of Cabinet Affairs =

Government ministry of South Sudan

The Ministry of Cabinet Affairs is a ministry of the government of South Sudan. The incumbent minister is Martin Elia Lomuro.

== List of Ministers of Cabinet Affairs ==
#	Name	Office		Party	President
1	Deng Alor Koul	2005	2011		
2	Martin Elia Lomuro	2011	2011	Sudan People's Liberation Movement	Salva Kiir
3	Nadia Arop Dudi	2011	2011	Sudan People's Liberation Movement	Salva Kiir
3	John Luk Jok	2012	2012	Sudan People's Liberation Movement	Salva Kiir
4	Josephine Napon	2012	2013	Sudan People's Liberation Movement	Salva Kiir
5	Michael Makuei Lueth	2013	2014	Sudan People's Liberation Movement	Salva Kiir
6	Jemma Nunu Kumba	2014	2015	Sudan People's Liberation Movement	Salva Kiir
7	Rebecca Joshua Okwaci	2015	2016	Sudan People's Liberation Movement	Salva Kiir
8	Deng Deng Akoon	2016	2016	Sudan People's Liberation Movement	Salva Kiir
9	Hon. James Janga Duku	2016	2017	Sudan People's Liberation Movement	Salva Kiir
10	Peter Bashir Bande	2017	2017	Sudan People's Liberation Movement	Salva Kiir
11	Beatrice Kamisa Wani	2017	2018	Sudan People's Liberation Movement	Salva Kiir
12	Angelina Teny	2018	2018	Sudan People's Liberation Movement	Salva Kiir
13	Pagan Amum	2018	2018	Sudan People's Liberation Movement	Salva Kiir
14	Salva Kiir	2018	2019	Sudan People's Liberation Movement	Salva Kiir
15	Joseph Malek Arok	2019	2019	Sudan People's Liberation Movement	Salva Kiir
16	Martin Elia Lomuro	2019		Sudan People's Liberation Movement	Salva Kiir
