= Nadia Arop Dudi =

South Sudanese politician

Minister of Culture, Museums and National Heritage
- Incumbent
- Assumed office March 2020
- Preceded by: office established

Minister of Culture, Youth and Sports
- In office 4 August 2011 – March 2020
- President: Salva Kiir
- Preceded by: Cirino Hiteng Ofuho
- Succeeded by: Albino Bol

Member of the National Legislative Assembly for Koch County
- Incumbent
- Assumed office July 2011

Member of the Southern Sudan Legislative Assembly for Koch County
- In office 2005–2011

Member of the National Assembly of Sudan for Koch County
- In office 2005–2010

Personal details
- Born: 1 January 1971 (age 55) Bentiu, Sudan (now South Sudan)
- Party: Sudan People's Liberation Movement
- Spouse: Amb. William Daud Riek Totor
- Children: 1. Agar 2. Chuol
- Education: University of Bahr El-Ghazal (BVS); University of Juba (MA)

Nadia Arop Dudi Mayom (born 1 January 1971) is a South Sudanese politician who has served in the South Sudan National Legislative Assembly since 2011, representing Koch County as a member of the Sudan People's Liberation Movement. Dudi is one of two Padang people serving in ministerial positions, alongside Simon Mijok Majak.

== Biography ==
Dudi was born on 1 January 1971 in the town of Bentiu, Western Upper Nile, Sudan. She graduated from the University of Bahr El-Ghazal in 2009 with a degree in veterinary science, and is currently attending the University of Juba, pursuing a Master of Arts degree.

In 2005, Dudi was elected to the National Assembly of Sudan, serving until 2010. The same year, she was elected to the semi-autonomous Southern Sudan Legislative Assembly, serving until 2011. Dudi represented Koch County as a member of the SPLM in both assemblies. From 2005 until 2007, Dudi was the chair of the Unity State SPLM.

Dudi has served in the South Sudan National Legislative Assembly since 2011, following the 2010 South Sudanese general election and the 2011 South Sudanese independence referendum. In July 2011, Salva Kiir, the president of South Sudan, appointed Dudi to be deputy minister of Agriculture and Forestry, Tourism, Animal Resources, and Cooperatives and Rural Development; she would hold these positions until June 2013. From August 2013 until March 2020, she was minister of Culture, Youth and Sports. During this period, she also served as acting minister of Gender, Child and Social Welfare in 2018. Since March 2020, she has been minister of Culture, Museums and National Heritage.

During her tenure as culture minister, South Sudan ratified a series of UNESCO treaties, and she helped lead an outreach program displaying archived documents from the National Archives of South Sudan. In 2016, Dudi was one of 60 government officials allegedly implicated in a scandal regarding the Bank of South Sudan, in which £443 million SSP of funds meant for the Crisis Management Committee was used to pay various politicians and companies.

Dudi is a member of the SPLM Politburo and is a founding member of the South Sudan Veterinary Council. She is married to Ambassador William Daud Riek Totor. They have two children.
