= Ministry of Roads and Bridges =

Government ministry of South Sudan

South Sudan Ministry of Roads and Bridges
Department overview
- Formed: 2011
- Jurisdiction: South Sudan
- Headquarters: Juba
- Minister responsible: Simon Mijok Mijak, Minister of Roads and Bridges

The Ministry of Roads and Bridges is a ministry of the Government of South Sudan. The incumbent minister is Gier Chuang Aluong, while Simon Majok Majak serves as deputy minister.

== List of Ministers of Roads and Bridges ==
#	Name	Office		Party	President	Note(s)
1	Gier Chuang Aluong	2011	2011	Sudan People's Liberation Movement	Salva Kiir	In office
2	Agnes Kwaje Lasuba	2011	2011	Sudan People's Liberation Movement	Salva Kiir	
3	Mary Ayen Mayardit	2011	2012	Sudan People's Liberation Movement	Salva Kiir	
4	Mary Kiden Kimbo	2012	2012	Sudan People's Liberation Movement	Salva Kiir	
5	Riek Machar	2013	2013	Sudan People's Liberation Movement	Salva Kiir	
6	Salva Kiir	2013	2015	Sudan People's Liberation Movement	Salva Kiir	
7	Taban Deng Gai	2015	2015	Sudan People's Liberation Movement	Salva Kiir	
8	James Wani Igga	2015	2015	Sudan People's Liberation Movement	Salva Kiir	
9	Aluel William Nyuon Bany	2015	2016	Sudan People's Liberation Movement	Salva Kiir	
10	Angelina Teny	2016	2016	Sudan People's Liberation Movement	Salva Kiir	
11	Rebecca Nyandeng De Mabior	2016	2017	Sudan People's Liberation Movement	Salva Kiir	
12	Peter Cirillo	2017	2017	Sudan People's Liberation Movement	Salva Kiir	
13	Johnson Gony	2017	2018	Sudan People's Liberation Movement	Salva Kiir	
14	Peter Gadet	2018	2019	Sudan People's Liberation Movement	Salva Kiir	
15	Rebecca Joshua Okwaci,	2019	2019	Sudan People's Liberation Movement	Salva Kiir	
16	Simon Mijok Mijak	2019	Since			

== See also ==
- Ministry of Transport and Roads (South Sudan)
