= Stephen Matoc Dut =

South Sudanese Politician

Stephen Matoc Dut (died 28 July 2011) was a South Sudanese politician. He was elected to the Lakes State Legislative Assembly as the SPLM candidate in the Maper constituency with 2,536 votes (83.61%).

He died on 28 July 2011 after falling unconscious at the Legislative Assembly in Rumbek two days earlier. He was 40 years old at the time.
