= Pricilla Nanyang =

South Sudanese politician

Priscilla Nanyang

Minister Without Portfolio
- Incumbent
- Assumed office 10 July 2011

Deputy Minister for Gender, Child and Social Welfare

Member of the National Assembly of Sudan
- In office 2005–2010

Chairperson of the Human Rights Committee, National Parliament

Personal details
- Party: Sudan People's Liberation Movement
- Education: University of Khartoum
- Profession: Physician; politician

Dr. Pricilla Nanyang (Priscila Nyanyang or Priscilla Nyayang Joseph Kuch) is a South Sudanese politician. She has served as deputy minister for gender, child and social welfare as well as minister without portfolio.

== Education ==
Nanyang earned a Bachelors of Medicine and Surgery in 1978 from University of Khartoum. She received her Masters of Community Medicine from in 1987 from the University of Khartoum.

== Career ==
Between 2005 and 2010, she served as a Sudan People's Liberation Movement (SPLM) in the National Assembly and Chairperson of the Human Rights Committee in the National Parliament. In 2007, Nanyang participated in an SPLM task force to try to facilitate peace talks in Darfur. Nanyang was one of seven women appointed to the South Sudanese cabinet in June 2010. She was appointed Minister Without Portfolio in the Cabinet of South Sudan on 10 July 2011. As Minister Without Portfolio, Nanyang led an eight-week research project, called "Comprehensive Evaluation of the Government of South Sudan", to study how the South Sudanese Government was performing since its formation in 2005.

She is also the former deputy minister for gender, child and social welfare. In 2014 she coordinated a meeting of women peace activists in Juba "to advance the cause of peace, healing and reconciliation." As deputy minister, she traveled to New York City in 2013 for the 57th Session of the Commission on the Status of Women and while in New York met with the Program on Peace-building and Rights at Columbia University's Institute for the Study of Human Rights. As of 2015 Nanyang also held the title of chairperson of the South Sudan Women Peace Network.

== See also ==
- Agnes Kwaje Lasuba
- SPLM
- SPLA
- Cabinet of South Sudan
