= Moses Ater Manyiel =

South Sudanese politician

Moses Ater Manyiel Mayen is a South Sudanese politician. He was elected to the Lakes State Legislative Assembly in 2010.

Moses Ater joined the SPLA/M in 1984 in Chak division. He was officially released by the army in 2008, upon his request. He then served in the DDR department. As of 2008, he functioned as Wulu County coordinator for the Constituency Development Fund.

He was proposed by Wulu chiefs to contest the 2010 election to the Lakes State Legislative Assembly, but was denied a ticket from the SPLM State Electoral College. He opted to contest as an independent from the Wulu constituency and won the seat with 2,232 votes (42.36%). During the election campaign he accused the SPLA of intervening in the electoral process in favour of the SPLM candidate.
