= Abdallah Albert =

South Sudanese politician

Abdallah Albert is a South Sudanese politician. He was Minister for Wildlife Conservation and Tourism in the Cabinet of South Sudan. He was appointed to that position on 10 July 2011. In 2013 he joined the armed opposition under Riek Machar. In 2018 he broke away and announced himself as the leader of the Eastern Front Army that defends the interests of Eastern Equatoria.

== See also ==
- SPLM
- SPLA
- Cabinet of South Sudan
