= Office of the President =

Office of the President can refer to:

- Office of the President of Brazil
- Office of the President of the People's Republic of China (entity in the Office of the General Secretary of the Chinese Communist Party)
- Office of the President (Republic of China)
- Office of the President of Croatia
- Office of the President of France
- Office of the Federal President of Germany
- Executive Office of the President of the Republic of Indonesia
- Office of the President of Iran
- Office of the President of Myanmar
- Office of the President (Nepal)
- Office of the President of the Philippines
- Presidential Executive Office of Russia
- Office of the President (South Korea)
- Office of the President (South Sudan)
- Presidential Secretariat (Sri Lanka)
- Office of the President of Ukraine
- President's Office (Bangladesh)
- Executive Office of the President of the United States
  - Oval Office, the room used as the office of the president of the United States
  - White House Office, an entity within the Executive Office of the President of the United States

== See also ==
- Cabinet Office (disambiguation)
- Prime Minister's Office (disambiguation)
