= Obuch Ojwok Akuo =

South Sudanese politician

Speaker of the National Legislative Assembly
- In office 16 December 2019 – May 2021
- Preceded by: Anthony Lino Makana
- Succeeded by: Jemma Nunu Kumba

Personal details
- Party: SPLM

Obuch Ojwok Akuo is a politician from South Sudan. He was the speaker of the South Sudan National Legislative Assembly from 2019 to 2021. He is a member of the SPLM who represents Eastern Equatoria. Ojwok is a Pari, an ethnic group in Lafon County, Imatong State. He became speaker on December 16, 2019 after the resignation of Anthony Lino Makana, who was accused of corruption. Ojwok, after becoming speaker, said he wanted to restore the reputation of parliament. Ojwok was the first deputy minister of Wildlife Conservation and Tourism when the post was created on August 26, 2011 after the independence of South Sudan on July 9, 2011.
