= Ministry of Higher Education, Science and Technology (South Sudan) =

Government ministry of South Sudan

South Sudan Ministry of Higher Education, Science and Technology
Department overview
- Formed: 2011
- Jurisdiction: South Sudan
- Headquarters: Juba
- Minister responsible: Gabriel Changson Chang, Minister of Higher Education, Science and Technology

The Ministry of Higher Education, Science and Technology is a ministry of the Government of South Sudan. The incumbent minister is Gabriel Changson.

== List of ministers of higher education, science and technology ==
| | Minister | In office | | Party |
|---|---|---|---|---|
| 1 | Joseph Ukel Abango | 2005 | 2011 | |
| 2 | Salva Kiir | 2011 | 2011 | |
| 3 | Peter Adwok Nyaba | 2011 | 2012 | Sudan People's Liberation Movement |
| 4 | Gabriel Kuc Abyei | 2012 | 2014 | SPLM |
| 5 | John Gai Yoh | 2014 | 2014 | SPLM |
| 6 | Deny Jock Chagor | 2014 | 2015 | SPLM |
| 7 | Awut Deng Acuil | 2015 | 2016 | SPLM |
| 8 | Deng Deng Hoc Yai | 2016 | 2017 | SPLM |
| 9 | Salva Kiir | 2017 | 2017 | SPLM |
| 10 | Aluel William Nyuon Bany | 2017 | 2017 | SPLM |
| 11 | Salva Kiir | 2017 | 2018 | SPLM |
| 12 | Awut Deng Acuil | 2018 | 2019 | SPLM |
| 13 | Deny Chigor | 2019 | 2019 | SPLM |
| 14 | Thuoch Loi | 2019 | 2019 | SPLM |
| 15 | John Gai Yoh | 2019 | 2020 | SPLM |
| 16 | Peter Adwok | 2020 | 2020 | SPLM |
| 17 | Gabriel Changson Chang | 2020 | Current | SSFDP |

== See also ==
- Ministry of Education, Science and Technology (South Sudan)
