= Madut Biar Yel =

South Sudanese politician

Madut Biar Yel is a South Sudanese politician. He is the current Minister for Telecommunication and Postal Services in the Cabinet of South Sudan. He was appointed to that position on 10 July 2011.

== See also ==
- Ministry of Telecommunication and Postal Services (South Sudan)
- SPLM
- SPLA
- Cabinet of South Sudan
