= Nyaluk T. Gatluak =

South Sudanese politician

Nyaluk T. Gatluak is a South Sudanese politician who served as Minister for Animal Resources and Fisheries in the Cabinet of South Sudan. He was appointed to that position on 10 July 2011 and parliament approved his dismissal just weeks later on 31 August.

== See also ==
- SPLM
- SPLA
- Cabinet of South Sudan
