= Hakim Monykuer Awuok =

South Sudanese Politician

- Born: 1978 (age 47–48); Jonglei State, South Sudan
- Citizenship: South Sudanese
- Education: Kampala International University
- Occupation: Civil Servant
- Employer: South Sudan Government
- Organization(s): Ministry of Education, Science and Tecchnology
- Website: https://hawuok.wordpress.com/

Hakim Monykuer Awuok is a South Sudanese and he works as Deputy Director of Resolutions at the Ministry of Cabinet Affairs, South Sudan. He is also an AG/ Deputy Director Protocol, Public and External Relations, Ministry of Education, Science and Technology.

== Early life and education ==
Hakim fled to Ethiopia due to civil wars in South Sudan. He continued his basic education in Ethiopia. He then fled back to South Sudan in 1991 when the government of Ethiopia fell on rebels. Hakim continued his education in displaced camps in Magalitore, South Sudan where they usually took their classes under trees. Due to the advances of the military troops, the camp was insecure and in 1995 Hakim fled to Kakuma Refugee Camp in Kenya where he continued his education in Grade 5 and 6. In 1996, Hakim went back to South Sudan and later proceed to Uganda where he completed his basic education in 1997 at Mirieyi Refugee Primary School in Adjumani District, Uganda. He was then admitted in Adjumani secondary school, Uganda in 1998 with the sponsorship of United Nations High Commissioner for Refugees. Unfortunately, he could not join due to lack of commitment fee of $5 per term. Hakim went back to South Sudan and studied at Fulla Secondary School funded by Jesuit Refugee Service (JRS), a humanitarian organization based in Rome, Italy. In 2000, he fled to Kakuma Refugee camp, Kenya due to forceful recruitment by the Sudan People's Liberation Army. In Kakuma, he joined Bortown Secondary School where he completed his secondary education in 2002. Trying to make ends meet, Hakim had to work in support of the family. After five years, he joined Kampala International University from 2007-2010 where he studied Bachelor of Arts in Public Administration. He holds a postgraduate diploma in Public Administration from the University of Juba. Ramakrishnan

== Work ==
Hakim is the Deputy Director of Resolutions at the Ministry of Cabinet Affairs, South Sudan. He organizes peace and reconciliation camps for children affected by wars. He provides technical support to the Council of Ministers in developing and disseminating legislation and policies and also monitors policy implementation. He also works to provide clean water to schools in villages. Hakim represents South Sudan as a consultant at AfriDev Exchange He is the founder of the Community Initiative for Peace and Development (CIPAD) and co-founder of Empowerkids — two not-for-profit organisations that help restore education and livelihood to deprived children especially victims of violence Hakim Monykuer Awuok is the acting AG/ Deputy Director Protocol, Public and External Relations, Ministry of Education, Science and Technology.

== Achievements and awards ==
In 2016, Hakim participated in the UNITAR South Sudan Fellowship Programme's cycle where he developed the program aimed at promoting to have a positive impact on IDPs in Juba, South Sudan's capital.
