= Puot Kang Chol =

South Sudanese politician

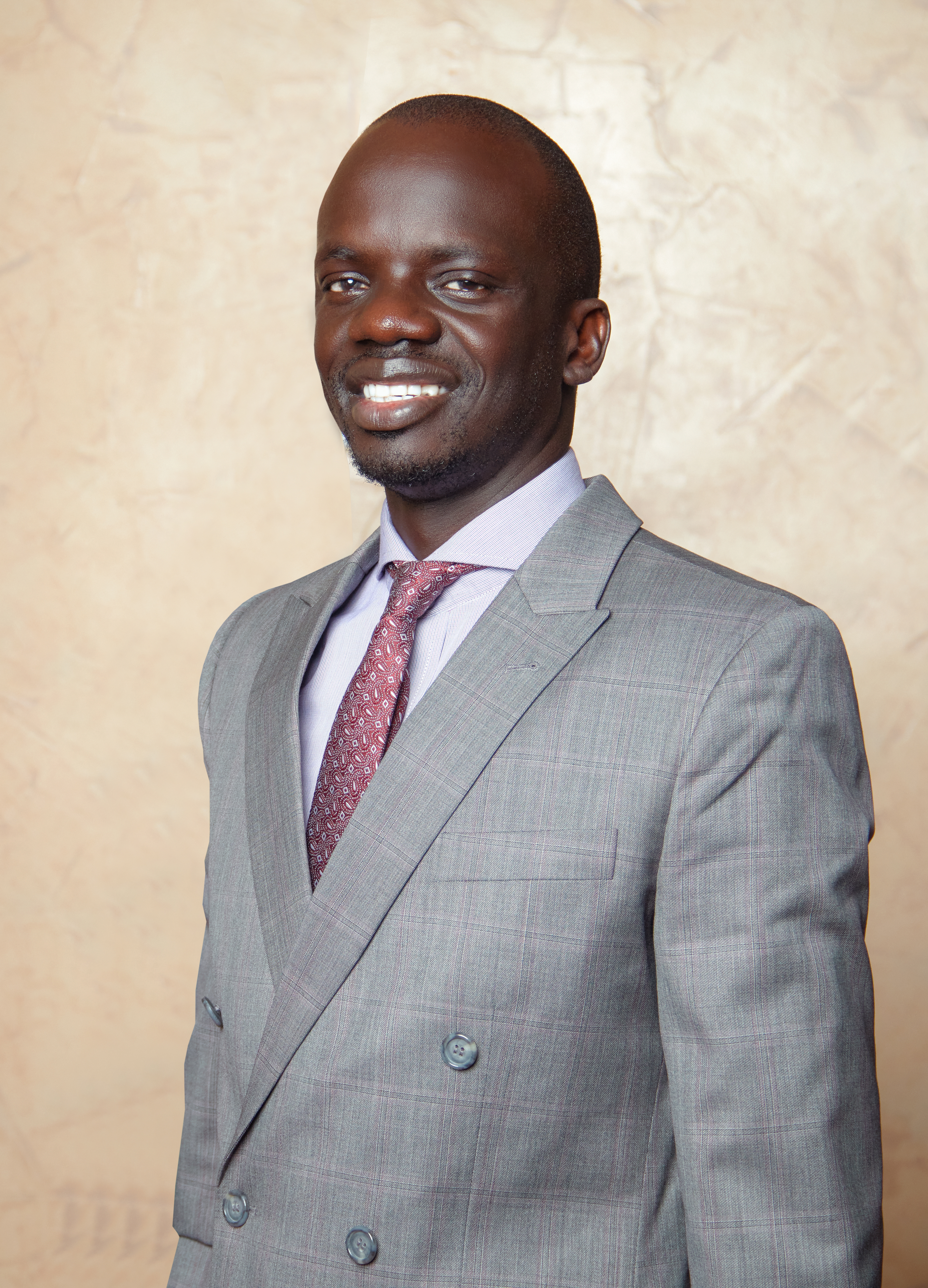
- Chol in 2022

Minister of Petroleum
- Incumbent
- Assumed office 2021
- President: Salva Kiir
- Preceded by: Martin Abucha

Personal details
- Born: 1 January 1985 (age 41) Mandeeng, Nasir County, Sudan
- Party: SPLM-IO
- Occupation: Politician

Puot Kang Chol (born 1 January 1985) is a South Sudanese politician who has served as the minister of petroleum in the Revitalized Transitional Government of National Unity (R-TGoNU) since 2021. He is a member of the Sudan People's Liberation Movement-in-Opposition (SPLM-IO).

== Early life and education ==
Puot Kang Chol was born in Mandeeng, Nasir County, Sudan, to Kang Chol and Rebecca Nyayiech Chang. Chol completed primary school in Dima Refugee Camp in Ethiopia, and then attended Kebena Secondary School in Ethiopia for high school. Chol attended Cavendish University in Kampala, Uganda, and graduated with a Bachelor of Law (LLB) in 2013.

== Political career ==
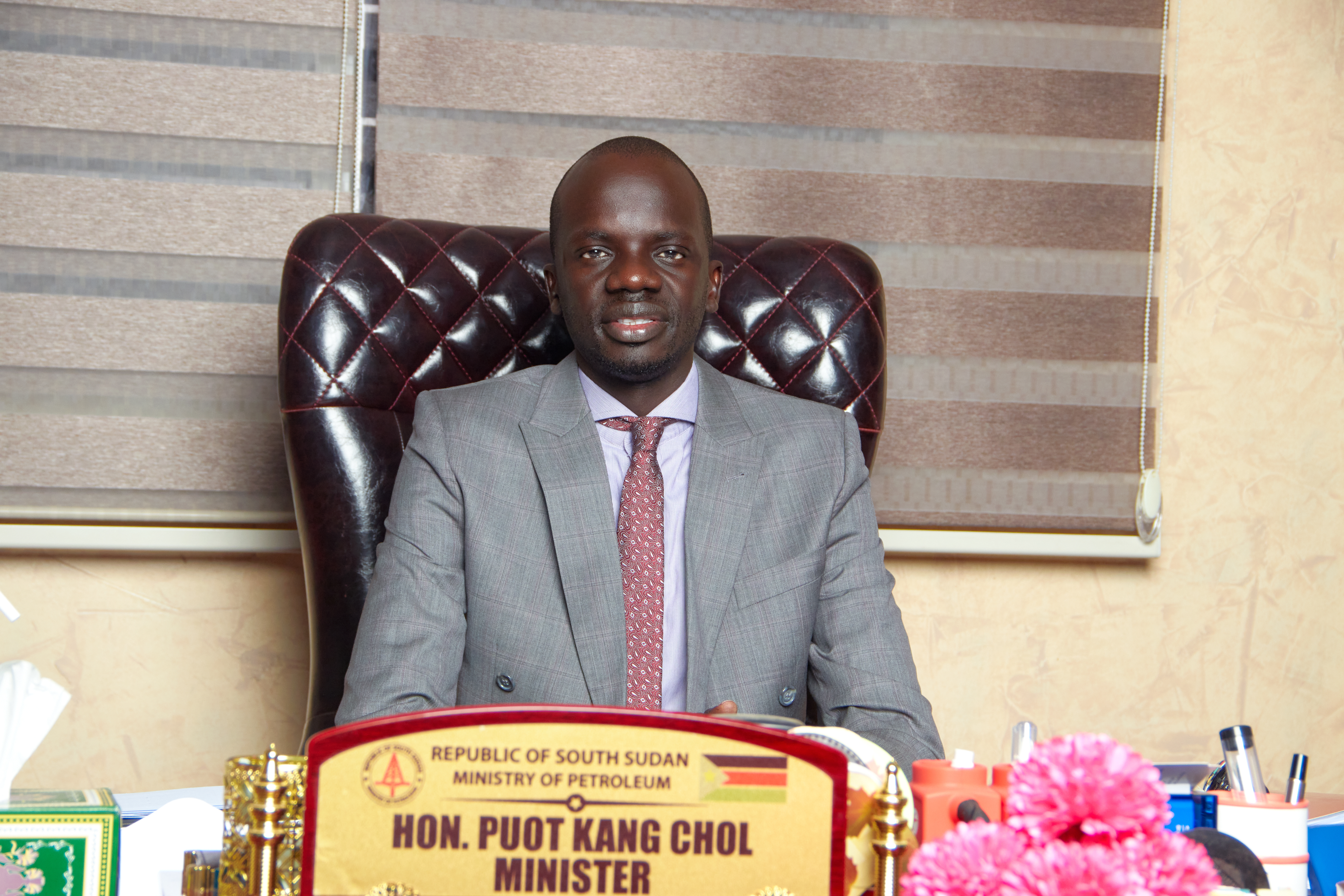
Chol in 2022

In 2010, Chol was appointed as an executive director for Ann Itto Leonardo, the then deputy secretary-general of the Sudan People's Liberation Movement (SPLM) Southern Sector. Chol became the SPLM's director of membership and recruitment; he retained the office until 2013.

In 2013, when South Sudanese president Salva Kiir in 2013 accused Vice President Riek Machar of an attempted coup, Chol supported Machar and fled Juba over fear of political persecution. He later joined the Sudan People's Liberation Movement-in-Opposition (SPLM-IO) and was appointed the leader of the Youth League.

After the signing of the revitalized peace agreement in 2020, Chol returned to Juba together and was appointed as the minister of petroleum in the Revitalized Transitional Government of National Unity (R-TGoNU). While in office, Chol has promoted the creation of a unified human resource manual for the country's oil sector employees. In 2021, he purchased geophysical aircraft for surveying and generate geophysical aerial data of oil and other mineral resources in South Sudan. Chang also contracted three companies to conduct an environmental audit on the impact of the country's oil industry on the environment.

On 5 March 2025, Chol was arrested along with his bodyguards and family on unspecified charges.
