= Anthony Lino Makana =

South Sudanese politician

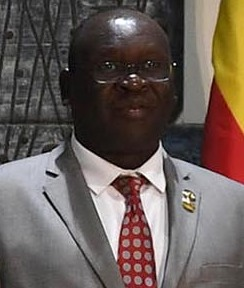

Speaker of the National Legislative Assembly
- In office 4 August 2016 – 8 December 2019
- Preceded by: Manasseh Magok Rundial
- Succeeded by: Obuch Ojok

Personal details
- Party: SPLM

Anthony Lino Makana is a South Sudanese politician. He was the Speaker of Transitional National Legislative Assembly of South Sudan from 2016 until his resignation in 2019. He was a former Minister of Transport and Roads in the Cabinet of South Sudan. He was appointed to that position on 10 July 2011.

He was appointed as the speaker of National Legislative Assembly in August 2016. Makana resigned as speaker on December 8, 2019, after being accused of embezzling funds and approving a $400 million loan from AFREXIM Bank without bringing it to the house.

== See also ==
- SPLM
- SPLA
- Cabinet of South Sudan
