= Shadrack Bol Machok =

South Sudanese politician

Shadrack Bol Machok is a South Sudanese politician. He was elected to the Lakes State Legislative Assembly in 2010.

In January 2010 he had been named as the reserve for the SPLM candidate Gideon Shulur for the Domuloto seat of the Lakes State Legislative Assembly by the SPLM Lakes State Electoral College Committee. However, he opted to contest the election as an independent instead and won the seat with 4,530 votes (53.96%), defeating Gideon.

As of 2018 he served as the Information Minister in the government of the Western Lakes State.
