= Samuel Ochola =

Media and Advertising expert

Samuel Kwenda Ochola
- Born: 16 March 1971 (age 55); Kisumu
- Citizenship: Kenya
- Education: Daystar University; BCom, Marketing; USIU-A; MBA, Strategic Management
- Known for: Media, Advertising, Marketing
- Title: Secretary General, Gor Mahia F.C.

Samuel Kwenda Ochola is a Media and Advertising expert, and the current Secretary General of Kenyan Premier League side Gor Mahia F.C.

== Early life and education ==
Ochola was born in Kisumu and went to school at Kisumu Boys High before proceeding to Daystar University in 2004 from where he graduated with a BCom in Marketing Management in 2010. Later in 2017, he attained an MBA in Strategic Management from USIU-A.

== Career ==
In his professional field, Ochola previously served as an Agency relationship manager for Kiss FM, Royal Media Services, and Capital FM between the years 2000 and 2006. He later started vernacular radio station Dala FM, Media buying agency Dialaradio, and vernacular TV station Lolwe Television Network (LTN).

In July 2020, Ochola ventured into football management after being voted in unopposed as the Secretary General of Gor Mahia F.C. even though he had prior reservation with the process.

Four months after assuming his role as Secretary General, in November 2020, Ochola was suspended by his club after signing a Football Kenya Federation-Startimes broadcast deal without recommendations of the club's executive committee. He hit back at the suspension with a swift reaction. However, there was a truce two months later after a "handshake" with club chair Ambrose Rachier.

In late 2023, he made public his intentions to vie for Football Kenya Federation Presidency during the next elections set for the year 2024.
