= LSLA =

LSLA can refer to:

- Lakes State Legislative Assembly, the legislature of the Lakes state of South Sudan
- Lincoln Savings and Loan Association, a failed savings and loan association
