= Corruption in South Sudan =

Corruption in South Sudan is among the worst in the world. The nation's elites have developed a kleptocratic system that controls every part of the South Sudanese economy. This system has taken shape quickly in a relatively short period, South Sudan having won self-rule in 2005 while remaining part of Sudan, and having been accorded full sovereignty in 2011.

According to one member of parliament, the nation has lacked any and all regulations to "combat frauds and malfeasance among the senior government officials," especially among government procurement officials within the Ministry of Finance and Economic Planning. In a 2013 article, Nyol Gaar Nguen wrote that "[o]utright thieves and looting of public funds in broad daylight by the enforcer or man in charge always reigns" in South Sudan. The degree of corruption and mismanagement revealed in the Auditor General's report for 2005 and 2006 reportedly "brought some MPs in South Sudan's National Legislative Assembly to tears." A 2012 report stated that more than $4 billion in government funds had been stolen since the advent of self-rule in 2005.

The major corruption scandal since the beginning of self-rule has been the so-called "Dura Saga," although there have been dozens of other significant instances of similar wrongdoing. These episodes have often been shrouded in confusion and have almost never resulted in prosecution or punishment. The Africa Review noted in 2013 that despite the South Sudanese government having ordered several investigations into scandals, they are virtually always ignored or intentionally sabotaged altogether. President Salva Kiir has repeatedly declared that his government is actively fighting corruption, but on April 12, 2013, he fired Elias Wako Nyamellel, Deputy Minister of Foreign Affairs and International Cooperation, "for acknowledging that South Sudan is corrupted and 'rotten to the core.'" The problem is compounded by the serious lack of transparency in South Sudanese government records and business information. Requests for official data can be arbitrarily turned down with impunity.

== Beginnings ==
South Sudan, notes a 2015 report by The Sentry, was founded with hope in mind with its citizens voting overwhelmingly for independence and the international community providing substantial assistance. Given its high level of oil revenues, South Sudan was predicted to rapidly attain self-reliance after the transition, but instead it "plunged into civil war, economic collapse, and creeping international isolation," while its rulers took over virtually every sector of the economy, squandering "a historic chance for the development of a functional state." The ongoing civil war is largely the result of conflicts among the elites who desire to "re-negotiate" shares of the political-economic power balance, including natural resources, through war.

== The corruption system ==
A report by the U4 Anti-Corruption Resource Centre, identifies the main types of corruption in South Sudan as bureaucratic corruption, patronage, political corruption, and embezzlement, and states that these forms of corruption take place largely in the following sectors: extractives, public financial management, and police and security forces.

A report by The Sentry categorizes corruption in South Sudan in a slightly different way, identifying the following four main methods the nation's wealth is diverted into the pockets of elites:

1. The extractives sector, the nation's largest revenue source, lacks any transparency and is completely mismanaged. Oil is the government's main source of hard currency, and serves as collateral for the foreign loans that keep its economy afloat.
2. The military state maintains control over the nation's economy directly by controlling the public budget and indirectly by close ties to businesses and contracts. South Sudan's military spending is higher than that of any other country in the region. Virtually no information about military allocations is provided, which in some cases is a violation of the law. The military involves "a large and complicated patronage system," and there is little oversight of payroll expenses, with the leading security ministries (Defense, Interior, and Intelligence) rarely reporting their payroll expenditures. In many cases, military commanders have stolen the salaries of soldiers; there are also tens of thousands of "ghost soldiers," i.e., soldiers who exist only on payroll documents, and this is said to be the primary method of military and security officials to divert wealth to private accounts. Military generals wield great power in allocating government funds, and often redirect non-military funds to military purposes. Acquisition of military weapons and supplies is carried out in an ad-hoc manner and is characterized by corruption, overpricing, and a lack of proper paperwork and transparency. The president's personal budget is "subject to very little oversight," and many items in it are outrageously inflated and apparently conceal military expenditures.
3. State spending involves a procurement system that is susceptible to corruption and waste, with lucrative contracts regularly awarded to the suppliers connected to government officials. Nearly every public institution is crippled by corruption and mismanagement. No-bid contracts, notably for roadbuilding and vehicle imports, are regularly awarded to companies owned by ruling elites at inflated prices with no oversight. State spending in South Sudan is marked by a "widespread disregard" for reporting, regulation, and documentation. Setting up companies involves dealing with an elaborate bureaucracy, and this complex system is believed to have enabled officials to profit extensively through bribes and the acquisition of undocumented shares in firms. Rules requiring annual financial disclosures are systematically ignored. A considerable amount of state funds is also diverted into shell companies that are used to divert state wealth on a large scale. In several cases, government contracts have been awarded to firms that had no background in the relevant activity and that were likely set up only days or even hours before the contracts were awarded.
4. Money laundering: Elites exploit the country's fragile financial industry by using it to launder money and generate revenue. South Sudan's elites are involved heavily in the financial sector, especially in speculation in the parallel currency market, which lowers the value of the currency and leads to inflation. The sector has expanded considerably since the country gained its independence, making it easier for elites to engage in illegal transfers. "Bulk cash couriers" allow for simpler and faster transfer of funds out of the country, with fewer disclosures and less traceability. In addition, several banks' board of directors lists name the same nation's elites, indicating these banks chiefly serve their interests. Also, private FOREX bureaus have been established, and facilitate money laundering and other illicit transactions. Some of them are reportedly owned by members of the elite, which would represent a major conflict of interest.
5. A major cause is also tribalism. Locked in a competition for power and control of resources and territory, South Sudan’s elites continue to pursue partisan political ends, mobilizing and exploiting ethnic differences and tensions.

== Dura Saga ==
In 2008, expecting a famine, the South Sudan government paid nearly $1 million, according to a 2013 report by the Voice of America, for cereals that were never delivered. This is known as the "Dura Saga," after the South Sudanese name for sorghum, dura. World Bank auditors found in February 2013 that 290 firms were paid without ever having signed a contract, and another 151 firms were overpaid significantly. A criminal probe launched in the wake of this audit sought to ascertain why the contractors were paid for goods that never arrived, why the prices were so high, and if government officials were involved in the scandal. The probe was to be led by Prosecutor General Filberto Mayout Mareng.

A February 2012 report by the Sudan Tribune described the Dura Saga as the largest and most costly corruption scandal in South Sudan since the nation's founding in 2005 and maintained that it involved the disappearance of not just one million but several billion dollars that had been allocated for the building and repair of grain stores and the purchase of grain. In a June 2012 article, Dr. Jok Madut Jok, Under Secretary of the National Ministry of Culture, put the missing amount at $4 million and added the funds were somewhere among the traders who falsely claimed to have delivered the grain, the governors who lied about the grain delivery or were criminally negligent, or the ministers of finance in Juba who approved payments for more than double the national budget.

A list of 81 fake companies that had allegedly been involved in the scandal was posted online in January 2013, along with appropriated amounts for each firm ranging from SSP 400,000 to SSP 2,000,000 . Among those blamed for the scandal were Michael Makuei Lueth, Parliamentary Affairs minister, whose then-ministry had registered the companies, and Benjamin Bol Mel, chairman of the Chamber of Commerce and owner of the ABMC construction company, who wrote to President Kiir to insist payment for the bogus contracts.

== Other incidents ==
An audit of government accounts showed that over $1 billion had disappeared without a trace from 2005 to 2006. The parliament subsequently summoned Arthur Akwen Chol, former Minister of Finance and Economic Planning, and Elijah Malok Aleng, former Governor of what was then called the Central Bank of Southern Sudan (CBoSS), and accused them of aiding corruption. Chol refused to appear; Malok did appear, and denied guilt, while saying that some of the missing funds had been diverted into Akwen's personal accounts. Akwen was also accused of buying government vehicles from the Cardinal Company at an inflated price, but Akwen said that he had made the purchase at the direction of Vice President Riek Machar. Machar, in turn, while admitting to having asked Akwen to purchase vehicles, denied being involved in the details of the transaction.

Between 2006 and 2012, the country spent $1.7 billion on road construction, but only 75 kilometres of roads had been built or paved. Stephen Madut Baak, a presidential advisor, was caught at Heathrow Airport in 2008 with allegedly $3 million in cash –which was later confirmed by the Government of Southern Sudan to be false information as Mr Stephen Madut Baak was only in possession of $137,000 to open the Government of Southern Sudan liaison office in London. Due to UK restrictions on such sums of money coming from countries outside of the European Union and failure to declare the funds, the money was seized by HM Revenue and Customs, however, the total sum was cleared of any suspicions and was released back to him by the local authorities within 24 hours. Also in 2008, Arthur Akuien Chol, former Finance Minister, reportedly stole $600 million. In 2009, a sum of $323,000 that was intended for East African students was deposited into a private bank account in Uganda.

On September 5, 2011, President Kiir demanded that SSP 488 million ($244 million) be awarded to ABMC Company, a private construction firm owned by a close associate of Kiir's, Benjamin Bol Mel, without the Council of Ministers' approval. The payment was supposedly for road construction, but as of 2013, according to Nyol Gaar Nguen, there was little evidence that the firm had actually done any construction work in connection with the contract. President Kiir reported $4 billion missing in 2012. In 2013, $6 million was reported stolen from the president's office. From 2012 to 2013, the Ministry of Roads and Bridges overspent its budget by 1513%. Cash sums of $14,000 and SSP 176,000 ($55,000) were reportedly stolen from the president's office in March 2013.

In April 2013, President Kiir fired the deputy Foreign Affairs minister for International Cooperation, Elias Wako Nyamellel, and suspended Yel Luol, an executive director in the president's office, Mayuen Wol, a personal assistant to the president, and Nhomout Agoth Cithiik, the accounts controller in the president's office, in connection with the disappearance of cash sums of SSP 176,000 and $14,000 from the president's office.

In May 2013, Rex Abdalla Nicholas, the Managing Director of Payii Roads and Bridges Company, was arrested for misappropriating funds intended for the construction of a road from Juba to Kajokeji. The arrest took place after he had repeatedly ignored a summons by the South Sudan Anti-Corruption Commission (SSACC). A June 1, 2013, news article stated that the committee investigating the disappearance of money from the president's office had submitted its findings to the president. Sources said that owing to "a lot of interference during the investigation process," the committee was unable to determine how much money had gone missing.

In a June 18, 2013, decree, President Kiir lifted the immunity of Minister of Cabinet Affairs Deng Alor and Finance Minister Kosti Manibe, demanding that they reveal their role in the transfer of nearly eight million US dollars to a business associate. Soon after, both ministers were suspended, accused of transferring the $8 million sum from the national treasury into a private account. On July 7, 2013, however, Pagan Amum said that Kuol and Manibe had been suspended for political reasons and that Kiir had left the true culprits untouched. Manibe also claimed his suspension to be politically motivated. Both ministers had allegedly been involved in a transfer scheme of over US$7 million to a firm known as Daffy Investment Ltd. The transfer had taken place without the president's knowledge or authorisation for the alleged purchase of anti-fire safes for the government. The president ordered that the two men be investigated and, if found guilty, criminally prosecuted. This was described as "the biggest ever scandal in the country's post-secession era, after President Kiir's letter to 75 senior current and former officials in his government, suspected of stealing a disputed figure of $4 billion US dollars over a six-year period."

As of August 2013, millions of dollars had been allocated for the expansion of the Juba Airport, but with few results. In September 2013, President Kiir accused his country's armed forces of corruption, saying they had squandered official funds on "dubious activities", citing names on the payroll of "ghosts", or "no-show jobs". In the first quarter of 2015, the SSACC received only 64% of its allocated budget, and the National Audit Chamber, which has reportedly produced "honest and detailed audit reports," received only 17%.

The South Sudanese army admitted in May 2015 that two senior military officers at the Ministry of Defence and Veterans Fffairs, Major General John Lat, director for procurement, and ministry under-secretary Bior Ajang Duot, had been suspended after being accused of corruption. The latter's office had apparently requested £37 million SSP to purchase stationery and other office supplies.

In May 2015, Clement Aturjong Kuot, deputy director for the South Sudanese government's official website, resigned, accusing minister Michael Makuei Lueth of nepotism. Kuot said Lueth had turned the ministry into a "family entity," promoting family members with no relevant media experience. Kuot said that as a result, his own skills were "wasted in the ministry of information and broadcasting" and he wanted to find some position in which he could serve the South Sudanese public.

Stephen Baak Wuol is alleged to have stolen $20 million in government funds, and Salva Mathok Gengdit, Deputy Minister of Interior, is alleged to have stolen $293 million.

== Domestic anti-corruption efforts ==
In 2009, President Kiir promised to give the South Sudan Anti-Corruption Commission (SSACC) power to prosecute the officials it investigates, but two and half years later the SSACC still lacked this power, and did not end up giving anything.

In September 2011 the SSACC stated that it was investigating about 60 corruption cases and sought to recover over £120 million SSP (about $20 million). In the same month, the South Sudanese government said it would strive to reform its tax collection system, having lost hundreds of millions of dollars as a result of the chicanery of phoney tax collectors. A committee formed to investigate the problem had found that unauthorised several import taxes on essential goods and services had caused prices to rise astronomically. Reportedly, various unauthorized agencies and individuals had demanded "tax" from importers of goods and then pocketed the payments.

In November 2011, according to one report, President Kiir "fired the head of the anti-corruption commission, Pauline Riak, and replaced her with a judge from the Supreme Court, Judge John Gatwech Lul, in a move that appeared to be an attempt to improve South Sudan's poor track record at fighting corruption." In February 2012, Gatwech Lul asked James Hoth Mai, Chief of General Staff, and his five deputies to ensure that army officers aid anti-corruption efforts by declaring their income and assets. Mai said the army would fully cooperate.

In May 2012, the Anti-Corruption Commission announced $60 million of stolen assets had been returned by government officials. A June 2, 2012, report stated that President Kiir had requested that over 75 former and current government officials demanding they account for missing funds in an effort to create more transparency. In the letter, he wrote, "I am writing to encourage you to return these stolen funds (partial or full)....If fund[s] are returned, the Government of the Republic of South Sudan will grant amnesty and will keep your name confidential. I and only one other official will have access to this information." Kiir said the letter was part of a new effort to combat corruption and create a more transparent and accountable government. Kiir also wrote to eight heads of state asking them to help recover about $4 billion believed to be in foreign banks.

Also in June 2012, Kiir said he had taken several additional measures to combat corruption. For example, he had issued several presidential decrees on the subject, had accepted about 500 "Declaration of Assets" forms from former and current officials, and had opened a bank account in Kenya to which stolen funds could be returned.

A 2013 report stated that the SSACC had, over a five-year period, failed to order a single corruption investigation. Also, no South Sudanese official had been prosecuted for corruption. The report noted that hundreds of corruption-related cases have been queued for years in South Sudan without any investigations. Another 2013 report said that South Sudanese authorities were enlisting the aid of forensic accounting experts from Europe and the United States to "assist the commission in using the latest techniques of tracing and detecting 'stolen' money from bank accounts around the world."

According to an UN report published in September 2025, the inaction is "a calculated strategy of predation and systematic mismanagement of governance, designed to enrich narrow elite interests and entrench power through the plunder of the country’s resources."

== Foreign criticism and actions ==
Reportedly, a list of 13 corrupt South Sudan officials, some of whom had suspiciously large accounts in foreign banks, was handed to South Sudan authorities by the U.S. in 2011. In May 2012, the U.S. stated that despite public statements about fighting corruption by Kiir, South Sudanese officials were continuing to commit acts of corruption with impunity. In June 2012, Tim Fischer, the special envoy of the Australian prime minister, called on South Sudan to pass legislation to improve transparency, accountability, and proper management in the country's mining industry. In July 2013, Fund for Peace, based in Washington, D.C., named countries it most considered failed states, ranking South Sudan at number four.

In a paper presented at Oxford University in June 2012, Mairi John Blackings stated that South Sudan's ruling party had failed to transition from a guerilla movement into a proper government. "The failure to separate the state from the party and the attendant failure to institute checks and balances within the various organs of the state lie at the centre of the general air of malaise suffocating and squeezing life out of the nascent nation-state of South Sudan, a year on," Blackings said.

Effective December 21, 2017, US President Donald Trump issued an executive order under the Magnitsky Act that specifically named Benjamin Bol Mel among the persons whose US-based assets are to be blocked.

In 2025, Transparency International's Corruption Perceptions Index scored South Sudan at 9 on a scale from 0 ("highly corrupt") to 100 ("very clean"). When ranked by score, South Sudan ranked 181st among the 182 countries in the Index, where the country ranked first is perceived to have the most honest public sector and South Sudan tied with Somalia for the lowest ranking. For comparison with regional scores, the best score among sub-Saharan African countries (Note: Angola, Benin, Botswana, Burkina Faso, Burundi, Cameroon, Cape Verde, Central African Republic, Chad, Comoros, Côte d'Ivoire, Democratic Republic of the Congo, Djibouti, Equatorial Guinea, Eritrea, Eswatini, Ethiopia, Gabon, Gambia, Ghana, Guinea, Guinea-Bissau, Kenya, Lesotho, Liberia, Madagascar, Malawi, Mali, Mauritania, Mauritius, Mozambique, Namibia, Niger, Nigeria, Republic of the Congo, Rwanda, Sao Tome and Principe, Senegal, Seychelles, Sierra Leone, Somalia, South Africa, South Sudan, Sudan, Tanzania, Togo, Uganda, Zambia, and Zimbabwe.) was 68, the average was 32 and the worst was South Sudan and Somalia's 9. For comparison with worldwide scores, the best score was 89 (ranked 1), the average was 42, and the worst was South Sudan and Somalia's 9.

== See also ==
- Politics of South Sudan
- International Anti-Corruption Academy
- Group of States Against Corruption
- International Anti-Corruption Day
- ISO 37001 Anti-bribery management systems
- United Nations Convention against Corruption
- OECD Anti-Bribery Convention
- Transparency International
