= Department of the Prime Minister and Cabinet =

Department of the Prime Minister and Cabinet is a government office in Australia and New Zealand:

- Department of the Prime Minister and Cabinet (Australia)
- Department of the Prime Minister and Cabinet (New Zealand)

== See also ==
- Cabinet department
- Prime Minister's Department (Malaysia)
- Prime Minister's Office (disambiguation)
- Cabinet Office (disambiguation)
