= Alex Latio Elia =

South Sudanese politician (born 1984)

Alex Latio Elia (born 12 August 1984) is a South Sudanese politician. Since 2023, Elia has served as the Minister of Animal Resources Fisheries and of Tourism for Central Equatoria State in the Transitional Government of National Unity (RTGoNU).

== Career ==
Alex Latio was appointed to the ministerial position when the Transitional Government of National Unity (R-TGoNU) was formed in February 2021. Latio is also the leader of the National Agenda, a registered political party in South Sudan, and was a signatory of the revitalized peace agreement.

In September 2022, Latio cautioned students from the University of Juba against early engagement in politics, urging them instead to prioritize their studies.
