= Makur =

Makur is both a given name and a surname. Notable people with the name include:

- John Marik Makur, South Sudanese politician
- Makur Maker (born 2000), South Sudanese-Australian basketball player
