= Kenyi =

Kenyi may be,

- Kenyi language
- Kenyi Cichlid (fish)
- Michael Roberto Kenyi, South Sudanese politician
