= Josephine Napwon Cosmas =

South Sudanese politician

- Citizenship: South Sudan
- Occupation: Politician
- Office: Minister of Environment and Forestry

Josephine Napwon Cosmas is a South Sudanese politician.She serves as the National Minister of Environment and Forestry in the Cabinet of South Sudan.
