= Scenius Hub =

Youth center in Juba, South Sudan

- Abbreviation: SH
- Purpose: Entrepreneurship and Innovation
- Headquarters: Juba
- Location: South Sudan
- Founder: Nelson Kwaje
- Website: https://www.sceniushub.com/

Scenius Hub is a youth centre located in Juba, South Sudan which provides space for entrepreneurship and innovation. It is located alongside Down Turkish Embassy Road, close to Winners Chapel, Thongpiny, Juba, South Sudan. The executive director and founder of Scenius Hub is Nelson Kwaje and he is the chairman of Defy Hate Now. Scenius Hub Website: https://www.sceniushub.com/

== Origin of the Name ==
Scenius has been described by musician Brian Eno as the genius of an individual.

== Events ==
- Scenius Hub hosted a workshop organized by UNICEF South Sudan and the Ministry of General Education and Instruction on 25 May 2023
- Scenius Hub also hosted the South Sudanese delegation's interaction with the youth during the Europe Day event organized by European Union.
- In September 2021, Scenius Hub also hosted an event of UNDP.
