= Paulino Wanawilla Unango =

South Sudanese politician and lawyer

Minister of Justice and Constitutional Affairs
- In office 2013–2020
- Succeeded by: Ruben Madol Arol Kachuol

Personal details
- Born: Western Bahr el Ghazal
- Died: 12 April 2020 Juba, South Sudan
- Occupation: Politician, lawyer

Paulino Wanawilla Unango (died 12 April 2020) was a South Sudanese politician and lawyer who served as the minister of justice and constitutional affairs of South Sudan from 2013 until 2020. He was a senior government official during South Sudan's early post-independence period, a time marked by political instability, armed conflict and international scrutiny of the country's legal and human rights record.

== Political career ==
Unango was appointed Minister of Justice and Constitutional Affairs in 2013, shortly before the outbreak of civil conflict in South Sudan later that year. In his capacity as minister, he was responsible for overseeing legal policy and representing the government's legal position during the crisis.

In January 2014, Unango stated that former vice president Riek Machar and other opposition figures could face treason charges in connection with the conflict, describing the events as an attempted overthrow of the government.

During his tenure, Unango responded publicly to reports by international human rights organisations concerning abuses during the conflict, disputing aspects of their findings and questioning the sources of some allegations.

Unango represented South Sudan at international forums, including the United Nations Human Rights Council, and led the country's delegation during its participation in the Universal Periodic Review process.

He also commented publicly on constitutional and legal matters, including proposals to amend the constitution in response to changes in the country's administrative structure.

== Death ==
Paulino Wanawilla Unango died on 12 April 2020 in Juba after a brief illness.

== See also ==
- Ministry of Justice (South Sudan)
- Politics of South Sudan
- South Sudanese Civil War
- Human rights in South Sudan
