= Ministry of Parliamentary Affairs =

Ministry of Parliamentary Affairs may refer to:

- Ministry of Parliamentary Affairs (Ghana)
- Ministry of Parliamentary Affairs (India)
  - Ministry of Parliamentary Affairs (West Bengal), India
- Ministry of Parliamentary Affairs (Pakistan)
- Ministry of Parliamentary Affairs (Portugal)
- Ministry of Parliamentary Affairs (South Sudan)
- Ministry of Parliamentary Affairs (Sri Lanka)
