= Peter Mercallo Nasir =

South Sudanese politician

Peter Mercallo Nasir is a South Sudanese politician who is the Minister of Energy and Dams as of 2022.

== Appointment ==
He was appointed by the president Salva Kiir, as the Minister of Energy and Dams in 2020.

== See also ==
Cabinet of South Sudan
