= Zakaria Matur Makuer =

South Sudanese Chairperson the Committee of Higher Education and a Member Of Parliament

Right Honourable Zakaria Matur Makuer
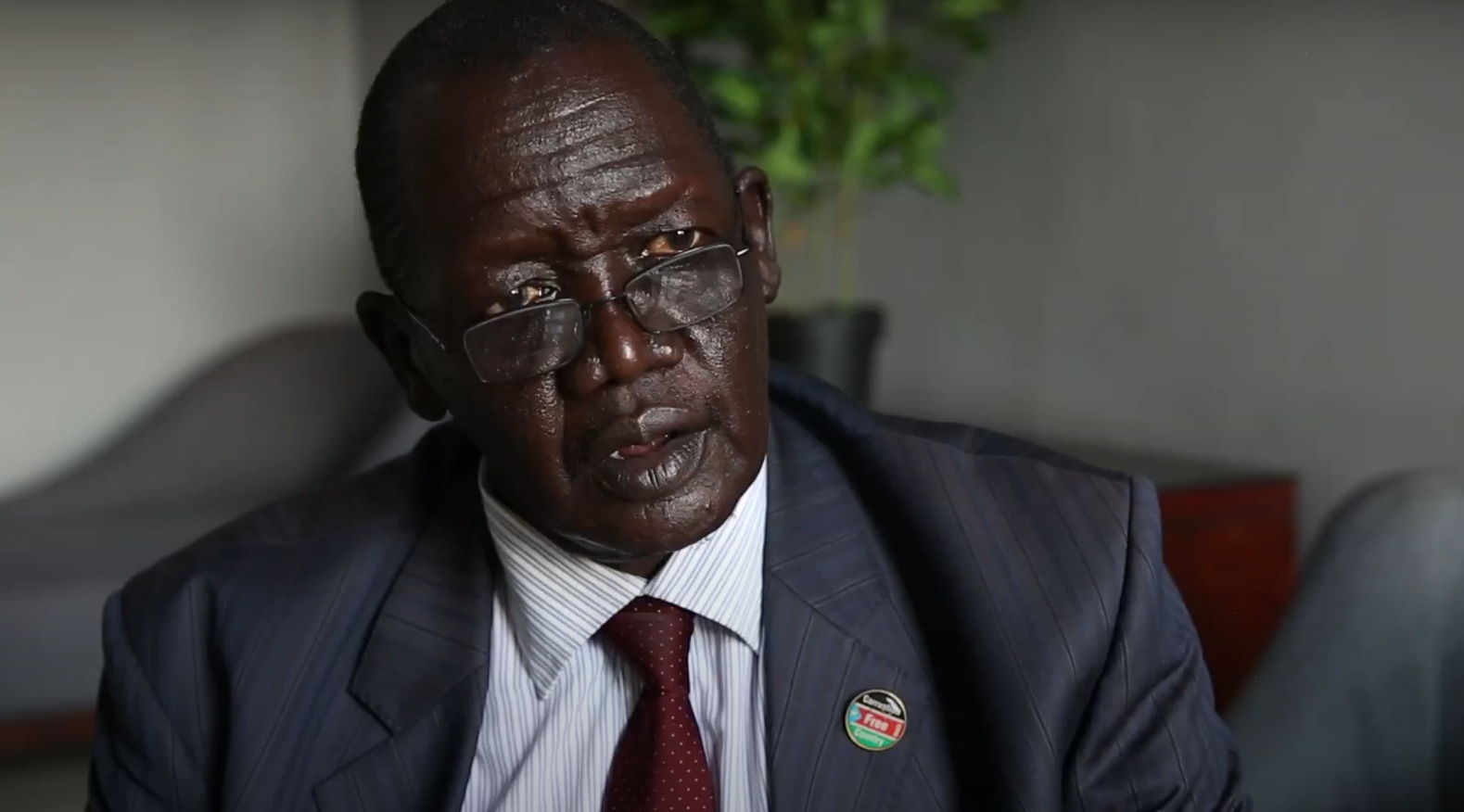
- Born: Zakaria Matur Makuer; 1 January 1963 (age 63); Rumbek Lakes State South Sudan
- Citizenship: South Sudanese
- Education: Masters of Education
- Occupation: Chairperson of the Committee of Higher Education
- Years active: 2022
- Organization: Government of South Sudan

Zakaria Matur Makuer is a South Sudanese politician. He is a member of the legislative parliament and is the current chairperson of Higher Education, Science, and Technology in the cabinet of South Sudan.

== Education and early life ==
Makuer was born on January 1, 1963, in Rumbek, Lakes State, South Sudan. He attended Rumbek Secondary School between 1976 and 1980 and then attained a scholarship that saw him leave for Lebanon where he graduated with a Master of Education from the American University of Beirut.

== Career ==
After graduating from the American University in Beirut in Lebanon, Makuer returned to South Sudan and worked with Across for several years, helping the local community in Rumbek. Then he was elected as a member of Parliament on May 1, 2012. He became the chairperson of the Committee of Higher Education and Technology in the Cabinet of South Sudan on January 3, 2022.
