= Zakaria Chol Gideon Gakmar =

Sudanese politician (1957–2010)

Zakaria Chol Gideon Gakmar (1957 – 29 July 2010) was a Sudanese politician, belonging to the Sudan People's Liberation Movement (SPLM). He was elected to the Lakes State Legislative Assembly in the 2010 election as a candidate on the SPLM party list.

Following his death, Zakaria Chol was lauded as a hero in the governor's speech at the 2010 Martyrs' Day celebrations in Rumbek.
