= Manasseh Magok =

South Sudanese politician

Speaker of the National Legislative Assembly
- In office August 2013 – 4 August 2016
- Preceded by: James Wani Igga
- Succeeded by: Anthony Lino Makana

Personal details
- Born: Manasseh Magok Rundial
- Party: NCP, SPLM

Manasseh Magok Rundial (born 1950, Koch County- Unity State Bentiu in a Jagei Nuer Section of the western Nuer.) is a South Sudanese politician and former speaker of National Legislative Assembly.

Magok is Nuer. He joined politics in 1982, and won a Bentiu constituency seat in Southern Sudan regional assembly. After 1985 he became governor of Upper Nile State. In 1990s he joined National Congress Party, but resigned in 2005.

Magok served as speaker from August 2013 to 4 August 2016. During his tenure the assembly ratified the "Compromise Peace Agreement".
