= John Marik Makur =

South Sudanese politician

John Marik Makur Lenpiny is a South Sudanese politician, belonging to the Sudan People's Liberation Movement. In 2010, he was elected to the Lakes State Legislative Assembly as a candidate on the SPLM party list. As of 2012, he serves as the speaker of the Lakes State Legislative Assembly.
