= Ministry of Culture, Museums and National Heritage (South Sudan) =

Government ministry of South Sudan

South Sudan Ministry of Culture, Museums and National Heritage
Ministry overview
- Formed: 2011
- Jurisdiction: South Sudan
- Headquarters: Juba
- Minister responsible: Nadia Arop Dudi, Minister of Culture, Museums and National Heritage
- Website: Official website

The Ministry of Culture, Museums and National Heritage is a ministry of the Government of South Sudan responsible for the preservation, promotion and development of the country's cultural heritage, museums, arts and historical resources. The incumbent minister is Nadia Arop Dudi.

== List of ministers of culture, museums and national heritage ==
Minister	In office	Party	President	Note(s)	Ref
Nadia Arop Dudi	Since 2020	Sudan People's Liberation Movement	Salva Kiir	In office	
