= Barnaba Okony Gilo =

South Sudanese politician

Honorable Barnaba Okony Gilo is a South Sudanese politician, belonging to the SPLM. Barnaba was elected as commissioner of pochalla in 1997 and became the first to introduce UN food aid to support pochalla citizen during summer where there is food shortages. Barnaba is a graduate of the Coady International Institute in Canada. He was elected to the Jonglei State Legislative Assembly in 2010 as a SPLM party list candidate (one of six SPLM party list candidate elected).
