= Gabriel Changson Chang =

South Sudanese politician

Dr. Gabriel Changson Chang is a South Sudanese politician. He worked in the Ministry of Wildlife Conservation and Tourism and was the acting Minister of Finance in the Cabinet of South Sudan and the Cabinet of Sudan from March 2007 to July 2007. He was appointed to that position in July 2011 and 2009 respectively. Chang is also the chairman of the FDP South Sudan Federal Democratic Party and interim chairperson of the South Sudan Opposition Alliance (SSOA). He is considered one of the founding fathers of South Sudan independence.

On July 15, 2020, Changson was appointed the Minister of Higher Education. Dr.Changson has served in seven different ministries.

In March 2023, Dr. Changson led the Federal Democratic Party with a call for free political space, peace and encouraging citizens to produce their own food and avoid reliance of food relief from Uganda, Kenya, Sudan and Ethiopia.

== See also ==
- Ministry of Wildlife Conservation and Tourism (South Sudan)
- Cabinet of South Sudan
