= Ministry of Youth and Sports (South Sudan) =

Government ministry of South Sudan

South Sudan Ministry of Culture, Youth and Sports
Department overview
- Formed: 2011
- Jurisdiction: South Sudan
- Headquarters: Juba
- Minister responsible: Dr. Joseph Geng Akech, Minister of Youth and Sports

The Ministry of Youth and Sports is a ministry of the Government of South Sudan. The incumbent minister is Dr. Joseph Geng Akech.

== List of ministers of culture, youth and sports ==
Minister	In office	Party	President	Note(s)
Cirino Hiteng Ofuho	August 26, 2011 to July 23, 2013	Sudan People's Liberation Movement	Salva Kiir	
Nadia Arop Dudi	Since August 4, 2013 to March 2020	Sudan People's Liberation Movement	Salva Kiir	
Dr. Albino Bol	March 12, 2020 to Nov 2023	Sudan People's Liberation Movement	Salva Kiir	

Dr Joseph Geng Akech November 17 to present
