= Ruben Madol Arol Kachuol =

South Sudanese Minister of Justice

Right Honourable Ruben Madol Arol Kachuol
- Born: Madol Arol Kachuol; 22 October 1952 (age 73) cueibet Lakes State South Sudan
- Citizenship: South Sudanese
- Education: Bachelor of Law
- Occupations: Former Minister for Justice and Constitutional Affairs
- Years active: 2020
- Organization: Government of South Sudan
- Height: 6.7 ft 0 in (204 cm)
- Spouse: Ayak Ajou

Ruben Madol Arol Kachuol is a South Sudan politician. He served as deputy chief justice and minister of justice and constitutional affairs in the Cabinet of South Sudan.

== Early life ==
Ruben Madol Arol Kachuol was born on 22 October 1952 in Cueibet. He attended Rumbek Secondary School between 1968 and 1972. He earned a professional degree at the school of law at the University of Khartoum. Kachuol owned fields where he planted rice in Aweil; the rice was used to feed people affected by the ongoing war at the time.

== Career ==
After graduating from the University of Khartoum, he practiced law by working in local community courts to settle community disputes in Rumbek, Aweil and Warrap. After this Kachuol was appointed deputy chief justice of South Sudan and was later relieved of his duties at the judiciary. He was appointed minister of justice and constitutional affairs in the cabinet of South Sudan on Friday March 13, 2020.

== See also ==
- SPLM
