= Agnes Kwaje Lasuba =

South Sudanese politician (1948–2023)

Member of the National Legislative Assembly
- Incumbent
- Assumed office 9 July 2011
- Constituency: Yei County, Central Equatoria

Minister of Gender, Child and Social Welfare
- In office 21 June 2010 – 23 July 2013
- Succeeded by: Awut Deng Acuil

Minister for Gender, Social welfare and Religious Affairs
- In office 2009–2010
- Preceded by: Mary Kiden Kimbo

Personal details
- Born: 14 August 1948 Torit
- Died: 16 September 2023 (aged 75) Nairobi
- Party: Sudan People's Liberation Movement
- Spouse: Joseph Oduho
- Education: University of East Anglia

Agnes Kwaje Lasuba (14 August 1948 – 16 September 2023) was a South Sudanese politician.

== Early life ==
Lasuba was born in Torit, Equatoria. She attended school from 1953 through 1964. Her family went into exile in 1964, causing Lasuba to take a break from schooling. She returned to secondary school in 1965, attending Nabingu Secondary School. She then attended Uganda College of Commerce and Administration, receiving a degree in secretariat and management in 1969.

She married Joseph Oduho, a South Sudanese politician, in May 1970 in a ceremony in Uganda. The pair returned to Sudan in 1972 after the Addis Ababa Agreement.

Lasuba began working as a secretary to the president High Executive Council in 1974. In 1976, she became third secretary of the Regional Assembly and the secretary general of the Women's Union, Southern Region, Juba.

== Higher education ==
In 1979, she went to the United Kingdom to study public administration and management at Devon, receiving her degree in 1980. She also earned a degrees in sociology from the Institute of Social Science in Hague, Holand 1985; a Bachelor of Arts in social studies from the University of East Anglia in 1990; and a Master of Science in gender and policy development also from the University of East Anglia in 1991.

== Career ==
From 1998 to 2003, Lasuba was active in the Sudan People's Liberation Movement (SPLM) while still living in the United Kingdom. She returned to New Sudan in 2003. Lasuba took part in the peace talks that would eventually lead to the Comprehensive Peace Agreement in 2005. Lasuba then served as a member of parliament. In 2009, she held the title of Minister for Gender, Social welfare and Religious Affairs. As part of President of the Southern Sudan, General Salva Kiir Mayarditwas, restructuring the cabinet in June 2010, she was named the Minister of Gender, Child and Social Welfare in the Cabinet of South Sudan. As Minister, Lasuba focused on gender equality and providing education for young girls. She also argued against girls marrying before the age of 18 or being forced to marry.

== See also ==
- Pricilla Nanyang
- SPLM
- SPLA
- Cabinet of South Sudan
