= Kuyok Abol Kuyok =

South Sudanese writer and the current Minister of General Education

Kuyok Abol Kuyok (born 1964) is a South Sudanese academic, author, and civil servant.

== Biography ==
Kuyok was given birth to in 1964 in Rumbek, Bahr el Ghazal, a region in South Sudan. He completed his early education at Rumbek Secondary School (1980–1982) and earned a Bachelor of Education (Arts) from the University of Juba in April 1988. He further obtained a Postgraduate Diploma of International Relations from the University of Khartoum in February in 1991. In 1993, he was awarded a Foreign and Commonwealth Office Fellowship to pursue a master's degree in education at the University of Hull. He later obtained another masters in Research in Education and Social Science, followed by a PhD from the Institute of Education, University of London.

Kuyok's career spans various roles in education and research. He taught geography in secondary schools in Khartoum from 1988 to 1993. Later, in the UK, he was a Research Fellow at London Metropolitan University's Institute of Policy Studies in Education. Returning to South Sudan in 2009, he became the Director General for Universities at the Ministry of Higher Education and then led the Technical Secretariat for the Southern Sudan 2011 Taskforce in the Office of the President. Currently, he teaches Sociology of Education and Comparative Education at the University of Juba's College of Education.

In February 2019, Kuyok was appointed Undersecretary of the Ministry of General Education and Instruction (MoGE&I), where he provides technical and administrative support to the ministry's leadership and oversees the implementation of educational policies and programs, like providing meals to students and provide additional funding to teachers.

As an author, Kuyok is known for his comprehensive work, South Sudan: The Notable Firsts, published in 2015. This biographical dictionary features profiles of over 700 significant South Sudanese personalities from various sectors. Kuyok writes for the Times Higher Education and The Conversation.
