= Ministry of Information, Communication Technology and Postal Services =

Government ministry of South Sudan

South Sudan Ministry of Information, Communication Technology and Postal Services
Department overview
- Formed: 2016
- Superseding Department: Ministry of Information and Broadcasting Ministry of Telecommunication and Postal Services
- Jurisdiction: South Sudan
- Headquarters: Ministries' Complex, Juba
- Minister responsible: Hon. Kuei Poy Kuei, Minister of Information, Communication Technology and Postal Services
- Website: mictps.gov.ss

The Ministry of Information, Communication, Technology and Postal Services is a ministry of the Government of South Sudan. The incumbent minister is kuei poy Kuei, while Baba Medan serves as deputy minister.

== Background ==
The signing of the CPA in January 2005 resulted in the formation of 24 Ministries for the Government of South Sudan (GOSS). The Ministry dealing with Information was initially constituted as Ministry of information, Communication, Technology and Postal Services (MOICT&PS) after South Sudan Council of Ministries’ (SSCM) resolution of August 2006.

== Mission ==
A well-informed nation of people makes informed decisions. Empowerment of citizens to participate in peace building, reconstruction and development through information, education, entertainment and being the watchdog of public interest and to be the leading institution in gathering and disseminating information for a prosperous ICT-driven society across South Sudan and beyond.

== Vision ==
To promote growth and development of the media, facilitate media coverage in the whole of South Sudan and to ensure that government policies, development programmes and activities are widely known, understood, to improve the livelihood of South Sudanese by ensuring the availability of accessible, efficient, reliable, and affordable ICT services, and put to action for the common good of the people of South Sudan and the world.

== Mandate ==
The ministry is mandated to: develop, oversee and execute the government of South Sudan policy on information; facilitate establishment and development of free press; disseminate information to empower and enable citizens participate in nation-building; be the official communication ministry of the government.

== Core Values ==
- Accuracy
- Integrity
- Impartiality
- Privacy
- Fairness
- Decency

== Leadership Team ==
- Hon. Michael Makuei Lueth - Minister
- Hon. Dr. Jacob Maiju Korok - Deputy Minister
- Dr. Wani Lado Kenyi - Undersecretary for ICT & Postal Services
- Dr. Yath Awan Yath - Undersecretary for Information

== Parastatals ==
- National Communication Authority (NCA)
- Media Authority (MA)
- Universal Service and Access Fund (USAF)
- Information Commission (IC)
- South Sudan Broadcasting Corporation (SSBC)

== List of ministers of information, communication technology and postal services ==
Minister	In office	Party	President	Note(s)
Hon. Michael Makuei Lueth	March 13, 2020	Sudan People's Liberation Movement	Salva Kiir	In office
