= Rachu Jakin Korok Lom =

South Sudanese politician

Rachu Jakin Korok Lom is a South Sudanese politician. Korok Lom was one of six SPLM candidates elected on the party list to the Jonglei State Legislative Assembly in the 2010 election.
