= Ateny Wek Ateny =

South Sudanese journalist

Minister of Information and Communication Technology and Postal Services
- Incumbent
- Assumed office 17 November 2025
- President: Salva Kiir
- Preceded by: Michael Makuei Lueth

Ateny Wek Ateny is a South Sudanese journalist, lawyer, and government official. He previously served as the Press Secretary to President Salva Kiir from 2013 to 2022. He is currently serving as the Minister of ICT and Postal Services of the Republic of South Sudan.

== Career ==
Prior to his government role, he worked as a lawyer, and as a journalist and columnist for The Citizen Daily newspaper.

Ateny worked as the press secretary to South Sudanese president Salva Kiir from November 2013 until his dismissal in 2022, He was the third Press Secretary in the Office of the President and the longest serving one. Prior to his appointment, Ateny was known for his public criticism of President Kiir's administration. Ateny's appointment was described by many advocates and political analysts as an attempt to silence the critics from derailing the image of the South Sudan's political leaders. On his second international trip with the president, Ateny clashed with Kiir, refusing to leave a meeting with the president of Uganda. Ateny's relationship with Kiir was strained after the Uganda trip and he worked in isolation, and in tension with the other staff at Office of the President, without access to senior officials.
