= Agnes Poni Lokudu =

South Sudanese politician and former government minister

The Honourable Agnes Poni Lokudu

Minister of Transport and Roads
- In office 9 July 2011 – 2020

Personal details
- Party: National Congress Party

Agnes Poni Lokudu is a South Sudanese politician who served as Minister of Transport and Roads in the Government of South Sudan from independence in July 2011 until 2020. She was among the first women appointed to a senior cabinet position following independence.

Lokudu has also held leadership roles in party politics, serving as Chairperson of the National Congress Party (NCP) in South Sudan.

== Career ==
Following independence on 9 July 2011, Lokudu was appointed Minister of Transport in the country's first cabinet by President Salva Kiir.

She continued to serve in the ministry during subsequent cabinet reshuffles, including reappointments in 2014, 2015 and 2019.

In December 2011, Lokudu launched South Sudan's first Road Safety Week, declaring that "road safety is a human right" and urging citizens to travel safely across the country.

In 2019, she participated in government meetings with Sudanese diplomats in Juba, reflecting her involvement in regional cooperation related to transport and infrastructure.

== Political leadership ==
Lokudu served as Chairperson of the National Congress Party (NCP), one of the political parties registered with the South Sudan Political Parties Council.

In July 2020, members of the NCP announced her suspension from the position of chairperson amid internal party disputes, citing alleged constitutional violations. Lokudu rejected the move, stating that she remained the legitimate leader of the party.

== See also ==
- Government of South Sudan
- Ministry of Transport and Roads (South Sudan)
- Salva Kiir
- Politics of South Sudan
