= Nathaniel Oyet =

South Sudanese politician

Nathaniel Oyet Peri

Deputy Speaker of the National Legislative Assembly of South Sudan
- Incumbent
- Assumed office 2021

Personal details
- Party: Sudan People's Liberation Movement-in-Opposition

Nathaniel Oyet Peri is a South Sudanese politician. He is the deputy leader of the Sudan People's Liberation Movement-in-Opposition, and has been deputy speaker of the National Legislative Assembly since 2021.

== Appointment ==
Nathaniel Oyet was appointed as the first deputy speaker of the 550-member parliament after the dissolution of the parliament in the 2018 peace deal in May.

Nathaniel Oyet was also appointed by the deputy chairman of the SPLM-IO, known as South Sudan's People`s Liberation Movement-In Opposition, by Dr.Riek Machar in South Sudan. Nathaniel Oyet is a member of the opposition on the side of the SPLM-IO that was created in 2013 from the ruling party SPLM.
