= Ministry of Housing, Physical Planning and Environment =

Government ministry of South Sudan

South Sudan Ministry of Housing, Physical Planning and Environment
Department overview
- Formed: 2011
- Jurisdiction: South Sudan
- Headquarters: Juba
- Minister responsible: Jema Nunu Kumba, Minister of Housing, Physical Planning and Environment

The Ministry of Housing, Physical Planning and Environment is a ministry of the Government of South Sudan. The incumbent minister is Jema Nunu Kumba, while Mary Nyawulang serves as deputy minister.

== List of ministers of housing, physical planning and environment ==
Minister	In office	Party	President	Note(s)
Jemma Nunu Kumba	Since July 2011	Sudan People's Liberation Movement	Salva Kiir	In office
