= Ministry of Justice (South Sudan) =

Government ministry of South Sudan

South Sudan Ministry of Justice
Department overview
- Formed: 2011
- Jurisdiction: South Sudan
- Headquarters: Juba
- Minister responsible: Ruben Madol Arol Kachuol, Minister of Justice
- Website: mojca.gov.ss

The Ministry of Justice for South Sudan was created when the country achieved its independence in 2011. The ministry performs functions such as representing the government in legal matters, drafting statutory laws, disseminating any legal-related documents to the public, and overseeing the legal profession in South Sudan.

== List of ministers ==
Minister	Tenure
John Luk Jok	2011-2013
Paulino Wanawilla Unango	2013–2020
Ruben Madol Arol Kachuol	2020–present

== See also ==
- Justice ministry
- Government of South Sudan
- Politics of South Sudan
