= Joseph Ukel Abango =

South Sudanese politician (1939–2021)

Personal details
- Born: Joseph Ukel Abango; January 1939 Wau, Anglo-Egyptian Sudan (now South Sudan)
- Died: 5 March 2021 (aged 82)

Joseph Ukel Abango (January 1939 – 5 March 2021), commonly known as Joseph Ukel, was a veteran-politician of what is now South Sudan and an educationalist by profession.

== Professional career ==
Joseph Ukel was born in January 1939 in Achot, a village close to the town bau in Bahr el Ghazal, when the Southern part of the Anglo-Egyptian Sudan was still isolated from the North due to the Closed District Ordinance. Ukel went to the catholic Elementary School between 1950 and 1954 in Mbili, southeast of Wau. When Sudan gained independence from the Condominium colonial rule in 1956, Ukel was attending the government Intermediate School in the Equatorian town of Maridi, where he graduated in 1958.

Staying in Maridi, he qualified as a teacher after completing a training course at the government-run Institute of Education between 1959 and 1962. The same year he started his first teaching-post in the Equatorian town of Kapoeta. When the Anyanya rebellion escalated in Equatoria, Ukel moved to Northern Sudan, where he first worked as a schoolteacher in the Gezira area and then continued his studies at the University of Khartoum. He received a BA in English in 1972 from there.

When the Addis Ababa Agreement of 1972 ended the Anyanya rebellion and granted Southern Sudan autonomy, Ukel moved back to Bahr el Ghazal, where he taught English at Rumbek Secondary School. In 1975 he took up further studies at the University of Edinburgh, receiving a postgraduate diploma in teaching English as a foreign language a year later. From 1976 to 1977 he returned to his home area to teach at Mbili Girls Secondary School, holding the posts of deputy headmaster and headmaster, respectively.

== Political career ==
In 1978 Ukel joined politics by contesting and winning his home constituency of Wau East in the elections to the Second People's Regional Assembly in Juba. He was re-elected in 1980 as a political ally of the Southern Front leader Abel Alier and appointed regional Minister of Culture and Information as Alier assumed the President of the High Executive Council. When Alier lost this office in October 1981, Ukel became the secretary for the publicity committee of the “Council for the Unity of the Southern Sudan” (CUSS) which advocated against the redivision of the South.

After the fall of Gaafar Nimeyri’s regime in April 1985, Ukel was a founding member of the “Southern Sudan Political Association’s” (SSPA) political party and in 1986 became its Parliamentary group leader in the national Constituent Assembly of Omdurman. In 1988, the SSPA joined other Southern and Nuba parties in a coalition called the United Sudan African Parties (USAP) that took the lead in organising dialogues with the rebel Sudan People's Liberation Movement (SPLM). Ukel became a minister of local government in the final coalition government of prime-minister Sadiq al Mahdi (25 April – 30 June 1989).

After the June 1989 coup, USAP was banned like all other parties and went underground. Ukel helped to form the domestic arm of the exiled National Democratic Alliance (NDA), an umbrella of parties and forces opposed to the “National Salvation Revolution” rule of General Omar al-Bashir, and was appointed its secretary general in 1992, while still working as a teacher of English language. When USAP chairman Hilary Logali died in 1998, Ukel became his successor. During this period, he was repeatedly detained by al-Bashir's government, the last time between December 2000 and October 2001 on charges of treason and sedition.

Ukel and Alier participated and mediated in the peace talks between the SPLM and al-Bashir's government in Naivasha, Kenya, which led to the Comprehensive Peace Agreement (CPA) in 2005. Under its power-sharing agreement, USAP was allocated ten seats in the National Assembly and Ukel was appointed Minister of Parliamentary Affairs in the Government of National Unity. In its campaign for the 2010 general elections, USAP defined as one of its main goals “unity in diversity” as opposed to separation, which it emphasized by the choice of Khartoum as its headquarters. It failed to win any parliamentary seats, complaining about illicit actions against its campaigning. Nevertheless, Ukel was appointed the Minister for Higher Education in the Government of Southern Sudan (GOSS).

After the independence of South Sudan in July 2011, Ukel was appointed Minister of General Education and served in this office until President Salva Kiir dismissed the whole cabinet in August 2013.

In the 2014 IGAD-led peace talks with the rebel SPLM-IO, Ukel was part of the government delegation, representing smaller opposition parties. In April 2017, Ukel as USAP chairman was one of nine candidates picked by the government to represent South Sudan at the East African Legislative Assembly. The same month, he was selected by Kiir as a member of the steering committee for the National Dialogue. However, he was not elected by the Transitional National Legislative Assembly in Juba in August 2017.

In early 2018, a power struggle between Ukel and Elia Lomuro over control of the political parties alliance was reported.

On 12 September 2018, the Revitalized Agreement on the Resolution of the Conflict in the Republic of South Sudan (R-ARCSS) was signed in Addis, Ukel was one of the six signatories representing the Umbrella Coalition of Political Parties.

However, when the National Dialogue Steering Committee held a regional conference in Wau at the end of February 2019, Ukel reportedly walked out after not been given the chance to address the gathering and resigned from the National Dialogue. In August 2019, Ukel was reportedly arrested in Wau on allegations of supporting the rebel SPLM-IO and put under house arrest in Juba by the National Security Service (NSS). Two months later, in Mid-October, he was released from his confinements and arrived in Khartoum "to seek medical treatment".
