= Obote Mamur Mete =

South Sudanese politician and government official

Obuto Mamur Mete

Minister of National Security
- Incumbent
- Assumed office 2020
- President: Salva Kiir

Personal details
- Born: South Sudan
- Occupation: Politician
- Profession: Government official

Obote Mamur Mete is a South Sudanese politician and government official. He was appointed Minister of National Security in the Government of South Sudan in 2020.

== Career ==
As Minister of National Security, Mamur has directed senior officers of the National Security Service (NSS) to safeguard elected leaders and uphold constitutional order.

He has urged NSS officers to remain focused on their national mission and avoid involvement in politics.

Mamur officiated the inauguration of a new NSS office in Yambio, Western Equatoria State, according to Radio Tamazuj, he called for stronger cooperation between security forces and local communities.

He has also emphasized continuity within the security apparatus, Radio Tamazuj reported that he advised new leadership to build on the work of predecessors.

In 2022, Mamur led a national delegation to Eastern Equatoria State to assess security conditions.

He has also supported government efforts to ban illegal gold mining in Eastern Equatoria, urging lawful resource management.

== See also ==
- Government of South Sudan
- Ministry of National Security (South Sudan)
- Salva Kiir
- Eastern Equatoria
- Western Equatoria
- Politics of South Sudan
