= Martin Abucha =

South Sudanese politician

Martin Abucha is the Minister of Mining for South Sudan. He was appointed after the resignation of his predecessor, Henry Adwar Dilah.
