= Cirino Hiteng Ofuho =

South Sudanese politician

Dr. Cirino Hiteng Ofuho is a Kenyan and South Sudanese politician and former civil servant.

== Background ==
Dr. Cirino Hiteng holds an MA and Ph.D. in International Relations from universities in Kenya and the United Kingdom. In the Transitional Government of National Unity (TGoNU) which was formed on 29 April 2016, he has been Deputy Minister of Foreign Affairs and International Cooperation from April 2016 to 12 July 2016 as a member of the Former Detainees also known as the SPLM-FD or SPLM Leaders.

Dr. Cirino Hiteng Ofuho has been Minister of Culture, Youth and Sports from 26 August 2011, shortly after the Independence of South Sudan on 9 July 2011, to 23 July 2013, when President Salva Kiir relieved all ministers and re-configured the ministries. Prior to that, he was from June 2010 to August 2011 the Minister in the Office of the President, Government of Southern Sudan. From 1998 to 2005 Dr. Cirino Hiteng has been an Assistant / Associate Professor in politics and international relations at the United States International University (USIU) in Nairobi. During that period, he has been a permanent member of the SPLM/A Delegation to the peace negotiations in Kenya from July 2002 to January 2005. After signing of the Comprehensive Peace Agreement in 2005 Dr. Cirino Hiteng was appointed as Deputy Minister of Southern Sudan’s Ministry for Regional Cooperation.

He is also a Kenyan citizen
