= Ministry of National Security (South Sudan) =

Government ministry of South Sudan

South Sudan Ministry of National Security
Department overview
- Formed: 2011
- Jurisdiction: South Sudan
- Headquarters: Juba
- Minister responsible: Gen.Obuto Mamur Mete, Minister of National Security

The Ministry of National Security is the ministry of the Government of South Sudan. Gen. Obote Mamur Mete is the current minister as of 2021.
