= Ministry of Petroleum and Mining =

Government ministry of South Sudan

South Sudan Ministry of Petroleum
Department overview
- Formed: 2011
- Jurisdiction: South Sudan
- Headquarters: Juba
- Minister responsible: Puot Kang Chol, Minister of Petroleum
- Website: www.mop.gov.ss

The Ministry of Petroleum is a ministry of the Government of South Sudan. The incumbent minister is Puot Kang Chol., the ministry of petroleum contributes more than 90% of South Sudan's total income through oil production and exportation via pipeline from the oil fields in South Sudan to Port Sudan on the Red Sea. The Government of Sudan taxes South Sudan heavily for using the pipeline and its associated infrastructure. The South Sudanese economy is sensitive to changes in global oil prices, with declines severely affecting the country's national income. In June 2021, the ministry launched its first Oil licensing round in Juba. According to new studies assigned by the ministry, approximately 90% of the country's Oil and gas reserves remain unexplored.

== List of ministers of petroleum ==
In office	Minister	Party	President	Note(s)
July 2011–April 2016	Stephen Dhieu Dau	Sudan People's Liberation Movement	Salva Kiir	relieved
August 2016-June 2019	Ezekiel Lol Gatkuoth	SPLM-IO	Salva Kiir	relieved
June 2019-March 2020	Awow Daniel Chuang	SPLM	Salva Kiir	relieved
March 2020-?	Puot Kang Chol	SPLM-IO	Salva Kiir	relieved
?-December 2021	Henry Odwar	?	Salva Kiir	resigned
2021–2021	Martin Abucha	SPLM-IO	Salva Kiir	
2021–present	Puot Kang Chol	SPLM-IO	Salva Kiir	

Major companies in South Sudan petroleum

1. Nile Petroleum cooperation
2. Petroleum Nasional Berhad (Petronas)
3. Akon Refinery company Ltd.
4. China National Petroleum cooperation
