= Cabinet Office (disambiguation) =

Cabinet Office may refer to:

- Cabinet Office (United Kingdom)
- Cabinet Office (Spain)
- Cabinet Office (Japan)
- Cabinet Office (Ontario)
- Cabinet Office (Sri Lanka)
- The Cabinet Office (New South Wales)

== See also ==
- Cabinet department
- Department of the Prime Minister and Cabinet
- Prime Minister's Office (disambiguation)
