= Jemma Nunu Kumba =

South Sudanese politician (born 1966)

The Right Honourable Jemma Nunu Kumba

Speaker of the Transitional National Legislative Assembly
- Incumbent
- Assumed office 2 August 2021
- Preceded by: Obuch Ojok

Minister of Parliamentary Affairs
- In office 2019–2021

Minister of Wildlife Conservation and Tourism
- In office 2015–2019
- Preceded by: Betty Ogwaro
- Succeeded by: Gabriel Changson Chang

Minister of Gender, Child and Social Welfare
- In office 2015–2015

Minister of Electricity, Dams, Irrigation and Water Resources
- In office 2013–2015

Minister of Housing, Physical Planning, and Environment
- In office 2010–2013

Governor of Western Equatoria
- In office 2008–2010
- Preceded by: Samuel Abu-John Kabbashi
- Succeeded by: Joseph Bakosoro

Personal details
- Born: March 8, 1966 (age 60) Tambura County, Western Equatoria, Sudan (now South Sudan)
- Party: SPLM
- Spouse: Dr. Festo Kumba
- Children: 5

Dr. Jemma Nunu Kumba (born 15 June 1966) is a South Sudanese politician and the current Speaker of the Transitional National Legislative Assembly since August 2021. She is the first woman to preside over South Sudan’s national legislature.

Kumba has served in several high-profile government and party roles, including Governor of Western Equatoria (2008–2010), Minister of Housing, Physical Planning and Environment (2010–2013), Minister of Electricity, Dams, Irrigation and Water Resources (2013–2015), Minister of Gender, Child and Social Welfare (2015), Minister of Wildlife Conservation and Tourism (2015–2019), and Minister of Parliamentary Affairs (2019–2021). She was also appointed Deputy Secretary-General of the Sudan People's Liberation Movement (SPLM) in 2015.

== Early life and education ==
Kumba was born in Tombura County, Western Equatoria, in 1966. Her family fled to a refugee camp in the Central African Republic during her childhood. She later attended Juba Day Secondary School from 1983 to 1986.

In the late 1990s, while accompanying her husband on SPLM assignments abroad, she studied at the University of Namibia, graduating with a bachelor’s degree in Public Administration and Political Science in 2002.

In 2022, she earned a Master’s degree in Security Studies from Egerton University in Kenya, graduating top of her class.

== Career ==
In the 1990s, Kumba worked as an administrator in SPLM-affiliated projects and later as a coordinator for the New Sudan Council of Churches. She participated in the SPLM’s delegation to the 2002 peace talks in Kenya, which led to the Comprehensive Peace Agreement in 2005.

Following the CPA, she became a Member of Parliament in Khartoum and later returned to South Sudan to hold various ministerial posts. She was the first woman appointed Governor of a South Sudanese state after the CPA, serving in Western Equatoria from 2008 to 2010.

She subsequently held national cabinet positions across housing, water, gender, wildlife, and parliamentary affairs before being appointed Speaker in 2021.

== Peacebuilding roles ==
Kumba has played significant roles in peacebuilding. In 2004, she co-founded the Sudan Women Parliamentary Caucus at the start of the peace process. She has also been part of national and regional negotiations to strengthen women’s participation in governance and peace agreements.

== JNK Foundation ==
In 2023, Kumba launched the **JNK Foundation**, a non-profit organization supporting vulnerable women and children in South Sudan.

== Honors ==
- First female Speaker of South Sudan’s national legislature (2021).
- Graduated top of her Master’s class at Egerton University (2022).
- Honorary Doctorate, University of Benin, Nigeria (2023).

== Personal life ==
Kumba is married to Dr. Festo F. Kumba, former Minister of Animal Resources and Fisheries. They have five children and belong to the Zande ethnic group.

== See also ==
- SPLM
- SPLA
