= National Legislative Assembly =

Lower house of the parliament of South Sudan

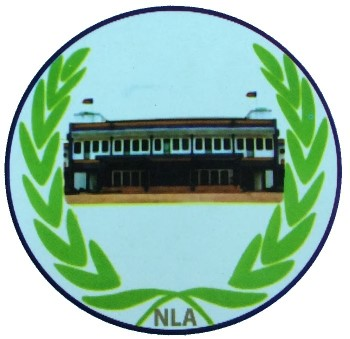

Type
- Type: Lower house of the National Legislature of South Sudan

History
- Founded: 2011

Leadership
- Speaker: Jemma Nunu Kumba, SPLM since 2 August 2021
- First Deputy Speaker: Nathaniel Oyet, SPLM-IO since 2 August 2021
- Clerk: Makuc Makuc Ngong, SPLM

Structure
- Seats: 550
- Political groups: SPLM (332); SPLM-IO (128); SSOA (50); Independents (30); Former detainees (10)

Elections
- Voting system: Coming soon: 158 seats are elected by First-past-the-post; 110 seats reserved for women are elected by Closed list proportional representation using divisor method; 47 seats unreserved are elected by Closed list proportional representation using divisor method; 17 seats are appointed by the President
- Last election: 11–15 April 2010 (elections to the preceding Southern Sudan Legislative Assembly)
- Next election: 22 December 2026

Meeting place
- Ministries Complex, Juba, South Sudan

Website
- nla.gov.ss

The National Legislative Assembly is the lower house of the National Legislature of South Sudan.

== Role ==
The Transitional National Legislative Assembly exercises the following functions:

- overseeing the performance of the National Government institutions;
- approving plans, programmes and policies of the National Government;
- approving budgets;
- ratifying international treaties, conventions and agreements;
- adopting resolutions on matters of public concern;
- summoning Ministers to answer questions of members of the Assembly on matters related to their ministries;
- interrogating Ministers about their performance or the performance of their ministries;
- approving appointments as required by the Transitional Constitution or the law;
- casting a vote of no confidence against the Vice President and any Minister;
- enacting legislation to regulate the conditions and terms of service of the Judiciary and its oversight mechanisms; and
- performing any other function as determined by the Transitional Constitution or the law.

== Composition ==
=== National Legislative Assembly (2011–2016) ===
Following independence in 2011, the National Legislative Assembly comprises:

- all persons who were members of the Southern Sudan Legislative Assembly; and
- all South Sudanese who were members of the National Assembly of Sudan, by virtue of their membership in that Assembly.

Members of the Council of Ministers who are not members of the National Legislative Assembly must participate in its deliberations but do not have the right to vote. Persons who wish to become members of the National Legislative Assembly must fulfill the eligibility requirements set down by the Constitution for membership of the National Legislature.

=== Transitional National Legislative Assembly (2016–2021) ===
As a result of a peace agreement that came into effect in 2015, a Transitional National Legislative Assembly was formed with 400 members. The membership is as follows:

- 332 members of the former National Legislative Assembly
- 50 members representing the armed opposition
- 17 members representing other parties and groups
- 1 member representing former detainees

=== Reconstituted Transitional National Legislative Assembly (2021–present) ===
As a result of a 2018 peace agreement that came into effect in February 2020, a Reconstituted Transitional National Legislative Assembly with 550 members was nominated in May 2021. The membership is as follows:

- 332 members of the former National Legislative Assembly (mainly from Sudan People's Liberation Movement)
- 128 members representing the Sudan People's Liberation Movement-in-Opposition
- 50 members representing South Sudan Opposition Alliance
- 30 members representing other opposition groups
- 10 members representing former detainees

== Speakers of the National Assembly ==
Name	Took office	Left office	Notes
James Wani Igga	2011	August 2013	
Manasseh Magok Rundial	August 2013	4 August 2016	
Anthony Lino Makana	4 August 2016	8 December 2019	
Obuch Ojok	16 December 2019	May 2021	
Jemma Nunu Kumba	2 August 2021	Incumbent	

== See also ==
- Southern Sudan Legislative Assembly – the preceding assembly 2005–2011
