= Mary Mawai =

Minister in South Sudan

Mary Nawai Martin also known as Mary Mawai is a South Sudanese politician and the minister of parliamentary affairs as of 2022

== Appointment ==
Mary Nawai was appointed as minister of parliamentary affairs on July 28. 2021, by President Salva Kiir.

== See also ==
- Cabinet of South Sudan
