= Prime Minister's Office =

Prime Minister's Office may refer to:

- Prime Minister's Office (Albania)
- Prime Minister's Office (Armenia)
- Prime Minister's Office (Australia)
- Prime Minister's Office (Bangladesh)
- Prime Minister's Office (Brunei)
- Office of the Prime Minister (Cambodia)
- Office of the Prime Minister (Canada)
- Prime Minister's Office (Denmark)
- Prime Minister's Office (Finland)
- Prime Minister's Office (Iceland)
- Prime Minister's Office (India)
- Prime Minister's Office (Israel)
- Office of the Prime Minister, Jamaica
- Prime Minister's Office (Japan)
- Office of the Prime Minister (Kazakhstan)
- Prime Minister's Department (Malaysia)
- Office of the Prime Minister (Norway)
- Prime Minister's Office (Pakistan)
- Prime Minister's Office (Singapore)
- Office of the Prime Minister (South Korea)
- Prime Minister's Office (Spain)
- Prime Minister's Office (Sri Lanka)
- Prime Minister's Office (Sweden)
- Office of the Prime Minister (Thailand)
- Prime Minister's Office (United Kingdom)

== See also ==
- Cabinet Office (disambiguation)
- Office of the President (disambiguation)
