= Benjamin Bol Mel =

South Sudanese politician and Businessman

Second Vice President of South Sudan
- In office 10 February 2025 – 12 November 2025
- President: Salva Kiir
- Preceded by: James Wani Igga
- Succeeded by: James Wani Igga

Personal details
- Born: 1978 (age 47–48)
- Party: SPLM
- Occupation: Former Vice President of South Sudan
- Profession: Businessman

Benjamin Bol Mel Kuol (born in 1978) is a South Sudanese politician.

Bol Mel is a businessman and has been President Salva Kiir's principal financial advisor. US President Donald Trump issued an executive order on 21 December 2017 under the Magnitsky Act to block his US-based assets.

Bol Mel was appointed as one of the vice-presidents of South Sudan on 10 February 2025 but was removed through a decree on 12 November 2025. Prior to this, he was SPLM deputy secretary general. He was dismissed from his position as Vice President and SPLM leadership on 12 November 2025.
