= Ezekiel Lol Gatkuoth =

- Born: 2 December 1973 (age 52); Upper Nile, Sudan
- Citizenship: South Sudan
- Known for: Minister at Ministry of Petroleum and Mining, South Sudan
- Title: Ambassador
- Spouse: Rachel Nyahok Gatkuoth (Deceased on 23 August 2017)

Ambassador Ezekiel Lol Gatkuoth (2 December 1973) is a South Sudanese diplomat and politician and a former Minister of Petroleum of the Republic of South Sudan, after having been appointed by President Salva Kiir on Tuesday 2 August 2016.

Ezekiel was a former Southern Sudan Ambassador, and head of Government of South Sudan Mission in United States of America before South Sudan became the 193rd member of the United Nations General Assembly on 9 July 2011. He had previously served as the Representative of the Sudan People’s Liberation Movement/Army (SPLM/SPLA); South Sudan’s ruling party to the United States of America, Canada and the United Nations.

== Life and education ==
Ezekiel Lol Gatkuoth was born in Jikany from Eastern Upper Nile State, South Sudan and a member of the Nuer ethnic group found both in the territories of South Sudan and neighbouring Ethiopia. He generally grew up in South Sudan where he was trained and served as a soldier in the Sudan Peoples’ Liberation Army (SPLA), and later became a refugee in Ethiopia, and then proceeded to United States^{[3]}. He continued his education in the US where he attended University of Maryland College Park earning a Bachelor of Arts in Criminology and Criminal Justice^{[4]} and later a Master of Science in Administration of Justice and Security from the University of Phoenix also in the United States of America. Until the time of her death on 23 August 2017, after a battle with breast cancer, Ambassador Ezekiel was happily married to Rachel Nyahok with whom they share three children (Duop, Nyamal, and Nyewech)^{[6]}.

== Work ==
Ambassador Ezekiel has been credited with using his extensive experience in diplomacy and international relations to show case the potential and attract extensive investment and interest in the oil and gas sector in South Sudan.

Under his tenure, South Sudan witnessed the signing of exploration agreements, construction of oil refineries and resumption of oil production in parts of the Country where oil output had previously slumped. In early 2017, South Sudan awarded an Exploration and Production Sharing Agreement for Block B3 to Pan African Nigerian owned Oranto Petroleum Limited which was the first time that an African player was joining this jurisdiction in a market dominated by Asian firms including China National Petroleum Corporation (CNPC), Malaysia’s Petronas and India’s Oil and Natural Gas Corporation (ONGC Videsh).

On 7 June 2018, South Sudan and its neighbour to the north Sudan agreed to repair oil infrastructure facilities destroyed by the conflict which culminated in the relaunch of oil production in Greater Pioneer Operating Company’s Tomas South (a key oil field) on 25 August 2018, for the first time since the conflict erupted in December 2013.

On 23 November 2018, South African Minister of Energy Jeff Radebe on a working trip to Juba, South Sudan announced the signing of a Memorandum of Understanding between South Africa and South Sudan which would see investments in the South Sudan Oil sector worth USD 1 Billion including the construction of an oil refinery and would also involve South Africa taking part in the exploration of several oil blocks and avenues for construction of a pipeline in the South of the Country.

The sector has also witnessed prospective investments and interest from Russian firms and others from the African continent.

== Political path and achievements ==
A supporter of the Sudan People’s Liberation Movement/Army (SPLM/SPLA), Ambassador Ezekiel Lol Gatkuoth was appointed as the Minister of Petroleum of the Republic of South Sudan and removed in April 2019.

He also served as Southern Sudan Ambassador, and Head of Mission of the Government of Southern Sudan in the United States of America from 2005 to 2011^{[12]}; making him one of the most highly ranked South Sudanese diplomats in terms of profile at the time of the independence of the Republic of South Sudan on 9 July 2011 and at the helm of the South Sudan Mission in New York when the Country’s flag was hoisted for the first time at the United Nations General Headquarters on 15 July 2011.

Prior to that he had served as the Head of the Sudan People’s Liberation Movement (SPLM) chapter offices in the United States of America, Canada and the United Nations from 1988-2004. Ezekiel Lol was among those who stood beside President Salva Kiir during SPLM convention in 2008 where in the same year he was elected a member of the National Liberation Council (NLC) of the party. Gatkuoth was one of those who demanded the opening of the political space in South Sudan in 2013 before the political crisis unfolded^{[14]}. As such, he was one of the former political detainees, who were arrested in the wake of the crisis on 15 December 2013[^{12]}. They were hosted by President of the Republic of Kenya, Hon. Uhuru Kenyatta from January–June, 2014^{[15]}. Lol later joined Sudan People's Liberation Movement-in-Opposition (SPLM-IO) in the Addis Ababa peace talks under the leadership of Dr. Riek Machar^{[3][16]}; a process that resulted in the signing of the Agreement on the Resolution of Conflict in South Sudan (ARCISS) in August 2015. He served as the Chairman (2015-May 2018) and Deputy Chairman (2014-2015) respectively of the National Committee for External Relations of the SPLM-IO. In December 2017, Ambassador Ezekiel Lol was a pivotal member of the delegation of the Transitional Government of the Republic of South Sudan (TGONU) to the peace talks between the Government of South Sudan and other Armed and Opposition groups a process formally known as the High Level Revitalisation Forum that culminated into the signing of a Peace Agreement on 12 September 2018.
