= Ministry of Parliamentary Affairs (South Sudan) =

Government ministry of South Sudan

South Sudan Ministry of Parliamentary Affairs
Department overview
- Formed: 2011
- Jurisdiction: South Sudan
- Headquarters: Juba
- Minister responsible: Mary Nawai Martin, Minister of Parliamentary Affairs

The Ministry of Parliamentary Affairs is a ministry of the Government of South Sudan. The incumbent minister is Michael Makuei Lueth.

== List of ministers of parliamentary affairs ==
Minister	In office	Party	President	Note(s)
Mary Nawai Martin	Since August 23, 2021	Sudan People's Liberation Movement	Salva Kiir	In office
