= Daystar University =

University in Kenya

Daystar University is a private Christian liberal arts university in Nairobi.

Daystar's original campus is close to Nairobi city centre, but there was no room to expand at that location. Therefore, in 1992 a new campus was built at Athi River, some 40 km to the south-east of the city, 5km off Mombasa Road which became the main campus.

== Academics ==
It has seven schools and fifteen academic departments which include

School of Communication

- Language and Performing Arts
- Media and Film Studies
- Strategic and Organizational Communication

School of Arts and Humanities

- Education
- Theology and Biblical Studies
- Peace and International Studies

School of Science, Engineering and Health

- Science and Engineering
- Computer Science

School of Applied Human Sciences

- Development Studies
- Psychology and Counselling
- Institute of Child Development

School of Business and Economics

- Commerce
- Economics
- Institute of Leadership and Professional Development

School of Law

- Media & Communication Law

School of Nursing

- Midwifery and Reproductive Health Nursing
- Community Health Nursing

== Notable alumni ==
- Biko Adema – rugby player
- Collins Injera – rugby player
- Larry Madowo – journalist
- Rebecca Joshua Okwaci – South Sudanese politician
- Mary Njoki – Business executive

== See also ==
- List of universities in Kenya
- Education in Kenya
