= Ministry of General Education and Instruction =

Government ministry of South Sudan

South Sudan Ministry of General Education and Instruction
Government Ministry overview
- Formed: 2011
- Jurisdiction: South Sudan
- Headquarters: Juba
- Minister responsible: Awut Deng Achuil, Minister of General Education and Instruction
- Website: https://mogei.gov.ss/

The Ministry of General Education and Instruction (MOGEI) is a national ministry of the Government of South Sudan in the current Transitional government of national Unity that is responsible for primary and secondary education, as well as the training of educators, in the Republic of South Sudan. The incumbent minister is Awut Deng Achuil.

== List of ministers of general education and instruction ==
Minister	In office	President	Note(s)
Joseph Ukel	2011–2013	Salva Kiir	
John Gai Yoah	August 2013 – March 2017	Salva Kiir	
Deng Deng Hoc Yai	April 2017 – 2020	Salva Kiir	
Awut Deng Achuil	2020–present	Salva Kiir	

== See also ==
- Ministry of Higher Education, Science and Technology (South Sudan)
