= Africano Mande =

Africano Mande Gedima, is a former Commissioner General of the South Sudan Revenue Authority, and formerly the Deputy Commissioner General of what was first referred to as National Revenue Authority in South Sudan. He became the first Governor of Maridi State, in the Republic of South Sudan, on 24 December 2015. Gedima served as an active duty military officer in the Sudan People's Liberation Army (SPLA) and rose up to the rank of a Major General in what is now the South Sudan People's Defense Forces (SSPDF).

Gedima started off in the Military by serving under the Sudan People's Liberation Army (SPLA) during the days when the SPLA fought for the liberation of Sudan and subsequently the independence of South Sudan. In the Military, Gedima played a wide range of activities ranging from instruction and combat planning to operations. Gedima, therefore, served in the SPLA in various capacities such as an instructor, Director of Military Research, Director of Planning and Strategy, Secretary for Military Transformation, and in other classified positions. While in the Military, Mande also served as a part-time lecturer at the University of Juba among others. Africano Mande basically contributed significantly to the ideas and frameworks aimed at transforming the SPLA into what had been referred to as "professional, accountable, affordable and operational effective military". Mande is known in the South Sudanese Military General Headquarters for his dictum that "the best soldier is one who talks about the next war that he is going to fight not about the war he has already fought."

== Achievements ==
Gedima is a graduate of Naval Postgraduate School in the United States where he holds a master's degree in National Security Studies and also won the Hans Jones Award for excellence in thesis Research in Special Operations & Irregular Warfare or Security.

Upon his appointment as the Governor of the newly created Maridi State, South Sudan at a time was also faced with a raging civil war and a collapsing economy.

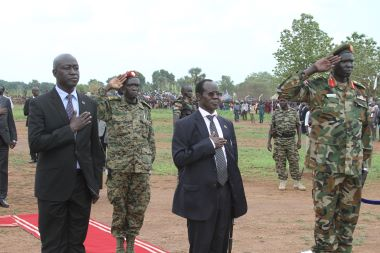
Gov. Africano Mande and VP Wani Igga in Maridi State

== Challenges ==
Gedima survived multiple attacks to his life and personality ranging from attempted assassination to blackmailing and witch-hunting. Whenever asked about these attacks on his life and personality, he often said that: "unfortunately we all live on this very earth where every day that comes, unfolds new interests and burry our moralities. I know all those who have done all these attacks on me. They did these things to me because they have been driven by their selfish interests and not their moralities. Let them also wait for my interests to surface and they will pay the heaviest prices ever."

== Passion ==
Africano Mande's passion has been in farming, wildlife conservation, Art and music, and poetry. Among some of the poems by Governor Africano Mande are: "Walking the Print of Lord", "Ana Zalaan", "The Colour Deserved", "The Sacred Children", "We the People", "My story", "The Warrior's Hymn", "Letter to my Dad", "Silent Departure", and "Woman's World". Mande has already published one book titled "Ana Zalan" and he has also produced one (1) unpublished book manuscripts which he hopes to publish in the future. Africano Mande's dedication to his Country and to Maridi State, encouraged his family members and close friends to establish the Africano Mande Foundation (AMF) in 2018, which to them is strictly a non-political and non-governmental Foundation named after Gedima, the first Governor of Maridi State. As its name suggests, the Foundation is a legacy Foundation which was founded by the family of Africano Mande Gedima in order to champion his philosophy, ideals, and vision through the philanthropic and non-governmental tracks.
