= John Gai Yoh =

South Sudanese politician

Minister of Higher Education, Science, and Technology
- In office 31 July 2013 – May 2016
- Preceded by: Adwok Nyaba
- Succeeded by: Adwok Nyaba
- Constituency: Maiwut

Minister of General Education and Instruction.
- In office July 2013 – May 2016
- Preceded by: Joseph Ukel
- Succeeded by: Deng Deng Hoc

Personal details
- Education: American University of Beirut (BA, MA) The University of South Africa (PhD)
- Occupation: Politician

John Gai Yoh (born 1964) is a South Sudanese politician and a member of the ruling Sudan People's Liberation Movement. He is the former Minister of Education, Science, and Technology of the Republic of South Sudan.

== Education ==
Yoh completed his basic education at Malakal Secondary School Malakal in 1983. He then joined the American University of Beirut and graduated with a BA in Political Science (1990) and a Masters of Arts in history (1995). Yoh subsequently entered the University of South Africa, where he obtained his Ph.D. in International Politics in 2008. Yoh has taught at universities in the Middle East and South Africa. He was a Resident Research Associate at the Royal Institute for Inter-Faith Studies, Amman, Jordan between 1996 and 2003 as well as a lecturer at the University of South Africa, Pretoria, between 2003 and 2007.

Yoh also authored several books, including The Idea of South Sudan: The History of Political Thoughts; Revolution on Equatoria Mountains: The Story of the Torit Mutiny; and The Hazards of Nation Building: Nurturing Competing Visions.

== Career ==
Before the independence of South Sudan, Yoh was the head of the government of Southern Sudan (GOSS) Southern African Liaison Office, Pretoria. This Mission was accredited to South Africa, Botswana, Angola, Namibia, Swaziland, Lesotho, Madagascar, Mauritius, and SADC Organization. After South Sudan's 2011 independence, Yoh served as the first South Sudanese ambassador to Turkey. He held this position until 2013 when President Salva Kiir subsequently appointed him Minister of Education, Science, and Technology, a position he served for 3 years. In 2016, Yoh was relieved by president Kiir as Minister of Education and was appointed Presidential Advisor on Education Affairs.

You is a Member of Parliament representing the Maiwut constituency. Yoh is also the Founder and Chairman of the South Sudan Center for Strategic and Policy Studies, a think tank in South Sudan.
