= Ministry of Wildlife Conservation and Tourism =

Government ministry of South Sudan

South Sudan Ministry of Wildlife Conservation and Tourism
Department overview
- Formed: 2011
- Jurisdiction: South Sudan
- Headquarters: Juba
- Minister responsible: Jemma Nunu Kumba, Minister of Wildlife Conservation and Tourism
- Website: temporary web site - www.bahr-el-jebel-safaris.com with park descriptions.

The Ministry of Wildlife Conservation and Tourism is a ministry of the Government of South Sudan. The incumbent minister is Rizig Zackaria Hassen, no deputy minister was name.

== List of ministers of wildlife conservation and tourism ==
| N | Minister | In office | | Party | President |
|---|---|---|---|---|---|
| | Gabriel Changson Chang | 9 July 2011 | 2013 | Sudan People's Liberation Movement | Salva Kiir |
| | Jemma Nunu Kumba | 2013 | 2013 | Sudan People's Liberation Movement | Salva Kiir |
| | Gabriel Changson Chang | 2013 | 2014 | Sudan People's Liberation Movement | Salva Kiir |
| | Betty Ogwaro | 2014 | 2015 | Sudan People's Liberation Movement | Salva Kiir |
| | Jemma Nunu Kumba | 2015 | 2017 | Sudan People's Liberation Movement | Salva Kiir |
| | Gabriel Changson Chang | 2017 | 2019 | Sudan People's Liberation Movement | Salva Kiir |
| | Michael Roberto Kenyi | 2019 | 2019 | Sudan People's Liberation Movement | Salva Kiir |
| | James Hoth Mai | 2019 | 2019 | Sudan People's Liberation Movement | Salva Kiir |
| | Gabriel Changson Chang | 2019 | 2019 | Sudan People's Liberation Movement | Salva Kiir |
| | Mayiik Ayii Deng | 2019 | 2020 | Sudan People's Liberation Movement | Salva Kiir |
| | Jemma Nunu Kumba | 2020 | Incumbent | Sudan People's Liberation Movement | Salva Kiir |
