= Onyoti Adigo Nyikec =

South Sudanese politician

Onyoti Adigo Nyikec is a South Sudanese politician and the Minister of Livestock and Fisheries

== Career ==
He was appointed as a minister in May 2019 by the president among other ministers.

== Controversy ==
Onyoti Adigo Nyikec, who at the time was a senior member of the Sudan People's Liberation for Democratic Change (SPLM-DC) had allegedly described the Sudanese president as a "crazy" and "emotional" leader who makes public statements without taking into consideration the likely consequences, but later the party SPLM-DC apologized.

In February 2025 Adigo described the purchase of a single bull for 20,000 US Dollars a "wrong mentality" and argued that "using animals for social prestige in marriages rather than commercial actively harms the economy". Later the minister retracted his statement.
