= South Sudan Federal Democratic Party =

Militant group in South Sudan

- Leaders: Major General Anthony Ongwaja, Mario Bertino
- Dates active: 2015
- Group: Lotuko
- Active regions: Torit
- Wars: the Ethnic violence in South Sudan

The South Sudan Federal Democratic Party (SSFDP), is a South Sudanese militant group fighting against the government around Torit in Eastern Equatoria State. This rebel group is different from but related to the larger similarly named "Federal Democratic Party/South Sudan Armed Forces" led by Peter Gadet, Gabriel Chang and Gathoth Gatkuoth.

The SSFDP surfaced at the beginning of December 2015, when a group of defectors from the SPLA seized control of a rural police post in Idolu near Torit. Soon thereafter they took the town of Longiro. A battle in Oguruny left that town badly damaged.

The SSFDP is led by Anthony Ongwaja, who claims to have defected from the SPLA with the rank of Major General with the aim of establishing federal democracy in South Sudan. Members are reportedly predominantly Lotuko people.
