= James Wani Igga =

South Sudanese politician (born 1949)

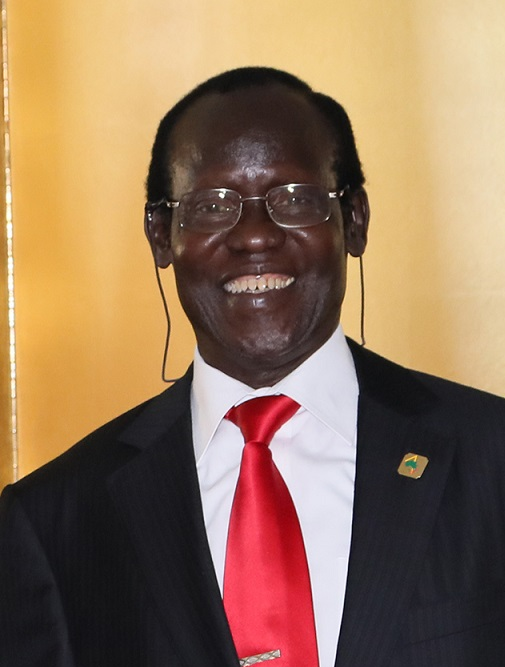
- Igga in 2019

Second Vice President of South Sudan
- In office 17 November 2025 – 21 September 2026
- President: Salva Kiir
- Preceded by: Benjamin Bol Mel
- In office 25 August 2013 – 10 February 2025
- President: Salva Kiir
- Preceded by: Riek Machar
- Succeeded by: Benjamin Bol Mel

General Secretary of the Sudan People's Liberation Movement
- Incumbent
- Assumed office 10 February 2025
- Preceded by: Peter Lam Both

Speaker of the National Legislative Assembly
- In office 2011 – August 2013
- Preceded by: Position established
- Succeeded by: Manasseh Magok Rundial

Speaker of the Legislative Assembly
- In office 2005–2011
- Preceded by: Position established
- Succeeded by: Position abolished

Personal details
- Born: 1949 (age 76–77) Krillo, Juba County, Central Equatoria, Anglo-Egyptian Sudan (now South Sudan)
- Party: SPLM
- Education: University of Cairo

Military service
- Allegiance: SPLA (Torit)
- Rank: Zonal Commander
- Commands: Yei

James Wani Igga (born 1949) is a South Sudanese politician who has been the secretary general of the Sudan People's Liberation Movement since 10 February 2025. He has been the second vice president of South Sudan and chair of the unity government's economic cluster from 21 February 2020 until 10 February 2025, and again from 17 November 2025 until 21 September 2026. He was speaker of the National Legislative Assembly from 2011 to 2013.

== Early life ==
James Wani Igga was born in 1949. He is variously described to stem from the Bari and Zande ethnic groups and he is a Roman Catholic. He studied at the Cairo University of Economics.

== Civil war years ==
Igga joined the South Sudanese rebels in 1985, training in Cuba and Ethiopia. He rose rapidly through the Sudan People's Liberation Army (SPLA) ranks, and, by 1987, had the rank of major and commanded the Shakus Battalion. The same year, he was Zonal Commander of Central Equatoria and a member of the SPLA/M High Command. He was reportedly well-respected among civilians.

Igga was one of the SPLA's most senior representatives during negotiations with SPLA-Nasir. He represented Garang as the head of the SPLA-Torit delegation at peace talks in Nairobi in November 1991. In 1993, he accompanied Garang to Nairobi for a peacemaking seminar in June and to Kampala for an IGAD-mediated dialogue with the Nasir faction. Igga had known Lam Akol, one of the Nasir leaders, since their time together in the Cuban training camp.

As chairman of the SPLM Political Affairs Commission, Igga established the Technical Committee of Intellectuals in February 2000. This committee was tasked with planning the civil administration of Southern Sudan.

== Post-war politics ==
Following the 2005 signing of the Comprehensive Peace Agreement establishing the autonomy of Southern Sudan, Igga was in charge of changing the SPLM from an insurgent strategic leadership to a political party. He was chosen as the speaker of Southern Sudan Legislative Assembly in 2005, and he continued in that office until independence in 2011. In addition, he was appointed caretaker governor of Upper Nile State for the transitional period.

Igga read out the proclamation of independence when the two Sudan's divided. He continued as the legislative speaker of the lower house from 2011 to 2013.

President Salva Kiir appointed Igga as vice president on 23 August 2013 to replace Riek Machar, who he had dismissed a month previously. He was required to resign as speaker. Igga was unanimously confirmed by the National Assembly on 26 August.

On 30 May 2020, Igga tested positive for COVID-19 during the COVID-19 pandemic in South Sudan.

On 19 August 2020, six of Igga's bodyguards were killed in a road ambush by National Salvation Front rebels in Igga's hometown of Lobonok. He was not with those bodyguards at the time.

On 10 February 2025, President Kiir implemented a cabinet reshuffle that resulted in the replacement of Igga as vice president by Benjamin Bol Mel and Igga becoming secretary-general of the SPLM.
