= Office of the President (South Sudan) =

South Sudanese government ministry

South Sudan Office of President
Department overview
- Formed: 2011
- Jurisdiction: South Sudan
- Headquarters: Juba
- Minister responsible: Barnaba Marial Benjamin, Minister on the Office of the President
- Website: op.gov.ss

The Office of the President is a ministry of the Government of South Sudan in charge of presidential affairs Barnaba Marial Benjamin is the incumbent minister as of September 2021
