= Martin Elia Lomuro =

South Sudanese politician (born 1957)

Martin Elia Lomuro (born 28 December 1957) is a South Sudanese politician. Lomuro is currently the minister of cabinet affairs in the Revitalised Transitional Government of National Unity (R-TGoNU) as of 2022. He is also the leader of the National Agenda, a registered political party formally known as South Sudan Democratic Forum, SSSDF.

== Controversies ==
In June 2021 Lomuro's bank accounts with a Kenyan Bank, Cooperative Bank were frozen after he was accused by the Kenya's Assets Recovery Control of an alleged money laundering. But in September of the same year, a court in Nairobi lifted the freeze order after it found Elia was not involved in any form of money laundering.

He told a gathering at the launch of his wife’s clothing fashion brand at the Pyramid hotel in Juba in July that he did not corrupt money to help his wife set up a successful business firm bearing the trademark JENM that designs outfits for only women and children raising public suspicions.

Martin Elia Lomuro was part of a committee that extended South Sudan's transitional government by two years, claiming that the decision was taken "to address the challenges that impede the implementation of the peace agreement".

== Sanctions ==
Lomuro is currently on an international black list after the US imposed sanctions on him in December 2019. He together with the then Minister of Defense Kuol Manyang Juuk were accused by the US government for their role in perpetuating South Sudan's years-long conflict by obstructing the country's stalled peace process.

== Other Roles ==
Martin Elia Lomuro served as the minister of Animal Resource and Fisheries in the previous government of Southern Sudan before being appointed as the minister of cabinet affairs by president Salva Kiir
