= Michael Roberto Kenyi =

South Sudanese politician

Michael Roberto Kenyi is a South Sudanese politician. As of 2011, he is the Minister of Agriculture and Forestry of Central Equatoria. His work currently focuses on challenges facing farmers in the Equatoria region, as well as the impact of humanitarian aid in the region.

== See also ==
- Politics of South Sudan
