= John Luk Jok =

South Sudanese politician (died 2020)

- Born: 1952
- Died: 2 June 2020 (aged 67–68); South Sudan
- Citizenship: South Sudan
- Occupation: Politician
- Employer: South Sudan Government
- Organization(s): Ministry of Justice and Constitutional matters
- Political party: SPLM

John Luk Jok (1952 – 2 June 2020) was a South Sudanese politician.

He was educated at the University of Khartoum from 1974 to 1977, where he earned a law degree. He later graduated from the London School of Economics in 1983.

Jok served as minister of justice from 10 July 2011 until 12 March 2020, when he was appointed minister of east African affairs.

Jok died in his home in Juba on 2 June 2020, aged 68 from COVID-19.

== Life ==
Jok was born c. 1952 in Akobo, Jonglei. He studied at the University of Khartoum and at the London School of Economics and Political Science (1974–1983), where he earned a Bachelor of Laws and a Masters in Economics.

He belonged to the Sudan People's Liberation Movement (SPLM). In 1983, he was appointed Deputy Spokesman of the SPLM/A in the UK and held the post until joining Riek Machar in August 1991. Then, in 1995, he separated from Machar and joined William Nyuon's faction.

He later returned to the SPLM/A and was one of John Garang's advisors during the Naivasha Agreement (CPA) negotiations. Following the Comprehensive Peace Agreement, he was appointed minister of youth and sport (2005–2008) and minister of petroleum, energy and mining (2008–2010).

In the 2010 elections, he was unable to prevail in Akobo West. Although he did not receive a seat in parliament, President Salva Kiir appointed him Minister of Justice. He held this post until July 2013, when the president dissolved the government.

As minister of justice, he played a key role in drafting the constitution of South Sudan, which concentrated power in the hands of the president. After the civil war broke out in 2013, he was imprisoned and accused, along with nine others, of attempting to overthrow the country.

The charge was later dropped, and Jok was sent into exile in Kenya. Following a peace deal with the government, he was appointed Minister of Transport and then Minister of East African Affairs in the renewed Government of National Unity in March 2020, the Revitalized Transitional Government of National Unity (RTGoNU).

== Death ==
Jok died in his home in Juba, on June 2, 2020 at the age of 68. His nephew Deng Bol, told Radio Tamazuj that John Luk died at home after a heart attack. “Luk had also been ailing from high blood pressure and malaria. On Tuesday at around 3 am, his blood pressure went high.”

== See also ==
- SPLM
- SPLA
