= Lakes State Legislative Assembly =

Legislature of the Lakes state of South Sudan

The Lakes State Legislative Assembly (LSLA) is the legislative assembly of Lakes state in South Sudan. The body is composed of 48 Members of Parliament; 29 representing geographic constituencies, 12 elected from women's list and 7 elected from party list. The assembly is based in the state capital Rumbek. Elections to LSLA was held in 2010, in which 46 Sudan People's Liberation Movement candidates were elected and two independents.

As of February 2012, John Marik Makur is the speaker of the Lakes State Legislative Assembly. As of March 2012, Enock Nhail Cahoc serves as the deputy speaker of LSLA.
