= Rebecca Joshua Okwaci =

South Sudanese politician

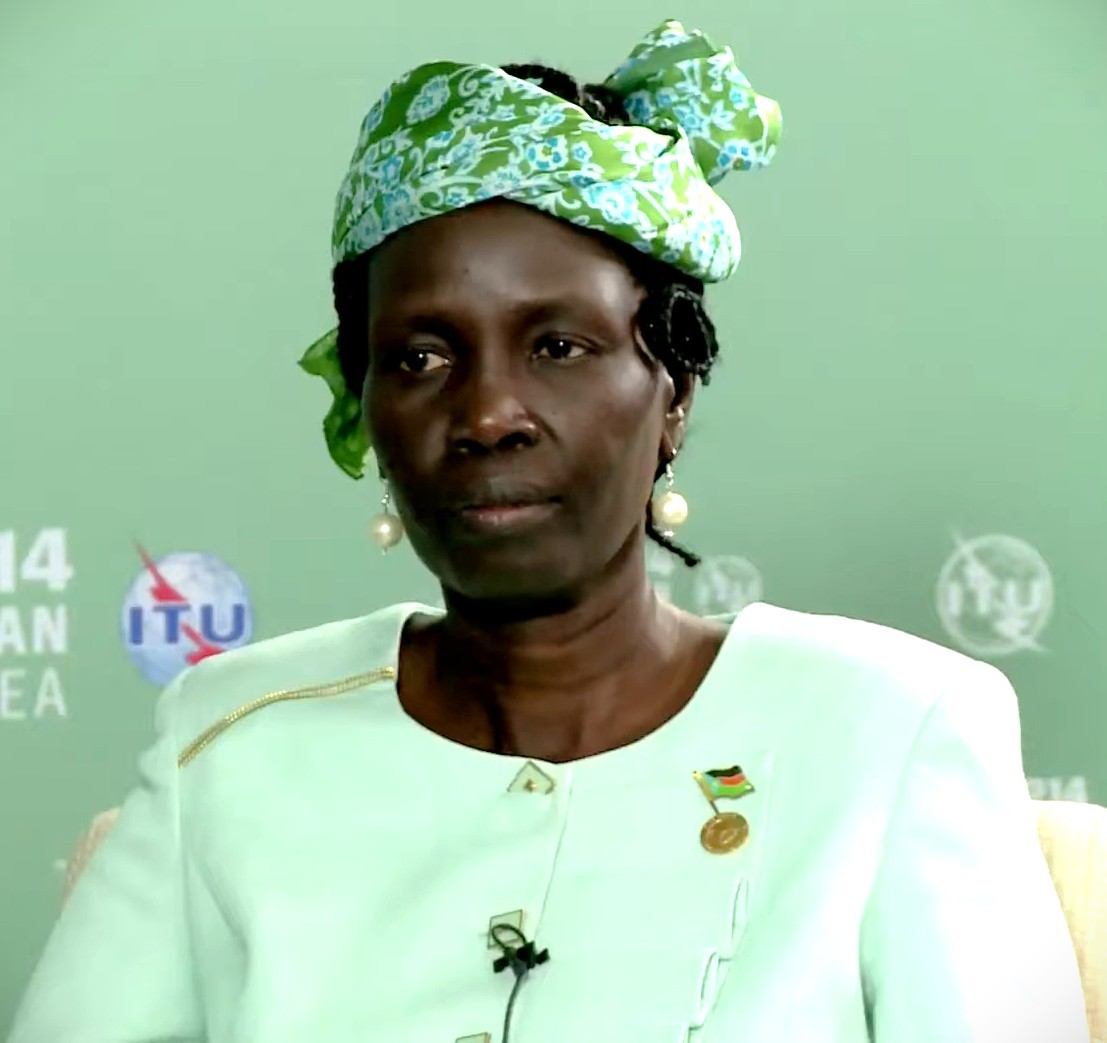
- Okwaci in 2014
- Citizenship: South Sudan
- Education: Bachelor degree in English language, literature and translation Masters degree in communication development
- Alma mater: Alexandria university Kenya's Daystar University
- Occupation(s): Politician and Journalist
- Organization(s): Sudanese women association Sudanese women voice for peace Member of parliament and the chief whip of the ruling SPLM party in the transitional National legislative Assembly ( 2022)
- Notable work: Worked as a journalist for Radio SPLA

Rebecca Joshua Okwaci is a South Sudanese politician, and a member of Parliament and the Chief Whip of the Ruling SPLM Party in the Transitional National Legislative Assembly as of 2022. She was the former Minister of Telecommunications and Postal Services and also the former minister of Roads and Bridges in the Government of the Republic of South Sudan. She is a "prolific peace campaigner and advocate of women's roles in peace", and she is a founder member of several Sudanese, South Sudanese or pan-African women's organisations, including being the Secretary-General of Women Action for Development. In December 2013, Jess Mathias of The Guardian described her to be an ideal role model for young girls over traditionally idolised women such as Rihanna and Beyoncé.

== Education ==
Okwaci earned a bachelor's degree in English language, literature, and translation from Egypt's Alexandria University, followed by a master's degree in communication development from Kenya's Daystar University.

== Journalist ==
Okwaci, during the second Sudanese civil war in 1986, joined the newly-formed Sudan People's Liberation Movement and began working as a journalist for Radio SPLA, where she became known as the "voice of the revolution".

== Politician ==
In January 2015, Okwaci signed an agreement with her Kenyan counterpart Fred Matiangi to lay 600 kilometres of fibre optic cable alongside a proposed Juba-Nadapal-Eldoret road. Okwaci led the South Sudan delegation, and said that this cable would improve South Sudan's connectivity with the rest of the world, and would "spur development, create job opportunities, and bring about peace and stability". The cable laying is expected to be finished earlier than the projected road completion date of 2022.

== Women's rights and peace activism ==
Okwaci is a founding member of several organisations, the Sudanese Women Association, based in Nairobi, Sudanese Women Voice for Peace, and Sudanese Women Empowerment for Peace. She is the Secretary-General of Women Action for Development (WAD).
