= Michael Makuei Lueth =

South sudan Minister of Justice and Constitutional affairs

Michael Makuei Lueth is a South Sudanese politician. He is the current minister of Justice and Constitutional affairs of the Republic of South Sudan.

Lueth hails from Bor, in a payam called Makuac payam and a clan called Koc. He joined the Sudan People's Liberation Army(SPLA) in 1983 to fight for the liberation of South Sudan along with his other comrades. He graduated as a lawyer at the University of Khartoum in 1977 and worked as a legal Counsel and as a Judge. It is with this background that he has been serving as the minister of information in the transitional government of National Unity in the Republic of South Sudan as of 2022.

== Sanctions ==
Lueth is currently on the list of Specially Designated Nationals and Blocked Persons list of the United States Office of Foreign Assets Control. The sanctions were placed on him in September 2017 after reports emerged that Lueth was instrumental in undermining Kiir's initial willingness to sign the peace agreement.

The United Kingdom also sanctioned the politician for "obstructing the political process in South Sudan, in particular by obstructing the implementation of the Agreement on the Resolution of the Conflict in South Sudan."

== COVID-19 ==
On 19 May 2020, he and all members of the nation's 15-member coronavirus task force tested positive for COVID-19.

== See also ==
- Cabinet of South Sudan
