= Sudan People's Liberation Movement =

Political party in South Sudan

Sudan People's Liberation Movement الحركة الشعبية لتحرير السودان
- Abbreviation: SPLM
- Chairman: Salva Kiir
- General Secretary: James Wani Igga
- Founders: Kerubino Kuanyin Bol; William Nyuon Bany; John Garang
- Founded: 16 May 1983 (43 years, 177 days)
- Headquarters: Juba (Archived 2014-01-02 at the Wayback Machine)
- Youth wing: SPLM Youth League
- Armed wing: Sudan People's Liberation Army (1983–2018)
- Ideology: Social democracy; Social market economy; South Sudanese nationalism; Civic nationalism; Social liberalism; Progressivism; Historically: New Sudan (until 2005); Socialism (until 2005); Marxism–Leninism (until the late 1980s)
- Political position: Centre-left Historically: Left-wing (until 2005); Far-left (until the late 1980s)
- National Legislative Assembly: 332 / 550 (60%)
- Council of States: 46 / 100 (46%)

Party flag
- Other flag

The Sudan People's Liberation Movement (SPLM; Arabic: الحركة الشعبية لتحرير السودان, Al-Ḥarakat ash-Shaʿbiyyat liTaḥrīr as-Sūdān) is a political party in South Sudan. It was initially founded as the political wing of the Sudan People's Liberation Army (SPLA; a key belligerent of the Second Sudanese Civil War) in 1983. On January 9, 2005 the SPLA, the SPLM and the Government of Sudan signed the Comprehensive Peace Agreement, ending the civil war. SPLM then obtained representation in the Government of Sudan, and was the main constituent of the Government of the then semi-autonomous Southern Sudan.

When South Sudan became a sovereign state on 9 July 2011, SPLM became the ruling party of the new republic. SPLM branches in Sudan separated themselves from SPLM, forming the Sudan People's Liberation Movement–North. Further factionalism appeared as a result of the 2013–2014 South Sudanese Civil War, with President Salva Kiir leading the SPLM-Juba and former Vice President Riek Machar leading the Sudan People's Liberation Movement-in-Opposition.

Although the party has not adhered to one consistent ideology since the independence of South Sudan and many factions exist, it has been described as "being on the left of centre ideological[ly] speaking", and section IV.2 of the party manifesto states support for a regulated market economy, with similar elements to social democracy.

== History ==
The SPLM was formed as a Marxist–Leninist, socialist rebel movement on 16 May 1983, after the Government of Sudan's abandonment of the Addis Ababa Agreement signed between the government of Gaafar Nimeiry and the Anyanya leader Joseph Lagu, who had first introduced the southern Sudanese to the effective political, economic, social, educational, and religious situations they would face after Sudan's independence. The movement published a manifesto setting out its positions and attracted a group of rebellious southern Sudanese soldiers of the Sudanese Army based in Bor, Pochalla, and Ayod (first called the Bor Mutiny). These joined remnants of the Anyanya rebels of the First Sudanese Civil War based in Ethiopia. Founders of the SPLA (the military wing of the movement) included Captain Salva Kiir, Samuel Abu John Khabas, Major William Nyuon Bany, Major Kerubino Kuanyin Bol and many other southern Sudanese officers of the Sudanese Armed Forces. Joseph Oduho was made chairman of the SPLM and Colonel John Garang, a Dinka army officer, was made commander of the SPLA. Oduho was later deposed by Garang, who made himself overall leader of the combined movement (SPLA/M).

The Government of Sudan has been associated with Islam and Arab descent and culture since then, in deep contrast with the SPLA, associated instead with Africanism, indigenous beliefs, African culture and, to a degree Christianity. It fought against the governments of Gaafar Nimeiry, Sadiq al-Mahdi and Omar Hasan Ahmad al-Bashir in what is now called the Second Sudanese Civil War. SPLA/M's declared aim was to establish a democratic Sudan with it as the leading party in control of the southern areas. The war has been largely described in religious and ethnic terms, and also as a struggle for control of the water and oil resources located in southern and western Sudan. In the late 1980s, Marxism–Leninism was abandoned in favor of a broadly Socialist platform.

In 1991, the SPLA-Nasir faction led by Riek Machar and Lam Akol attempted to overthrow chairman Garang. The attempt failed but led to widespread fighting in the south and the formation of other rebel groups, such as Kerubino Kuanyin Bol's SPLA Bahr-al-Ghazal faction. These internal divisions hampered negotiations with the government. SPLA-Nasir renamed itself SPLA-United and then transformed itself, with substantial personnel changes, into the South Sudan Independence Movement/Army. Several smaller factions signed the Khartoum Peace Agreement with the government in April 1997 and formed the United Democratic Salvation Front (UDSF). In July 1992, a government offensive seized southern Sudan, and captured the SPLA headquarters in Torit.

The Sudanese government accused Uganda and Eritrea of supporting the SPLA/M, who were alleged to have operated on the Ugandan side of the Sudanese border with Uganda at the southern limit of Sudan. In 2005, a treaty between the SPLA/M and the Sudanese government led to the formal recognition of Southern Sudanese autonomy. SPLM joined the government as part of the 2005 peace agreement, gaining about one-third of government positions. On 11 October 2007, the SPLM withdrew from the government, alleging violations of the peace agreement; this raised concerns about the future of the agreement. In 2012, as a consequence of South Sudanese independence, SPLM became the new country's governing political party and the SPLA the country's army. The Sudan branch separated from the movement and formed SPLM-N to carry out anti-government activities in Sudan.

=== Factionalism ===
- SPLM-DC (Democratic Change, 2009–present)
- SPLM–N (North, 2011–present)
- SPLM-IG (In Government, 2013–present)
- SPLM-IO (In-Opposition, 2013–present)
- SPLM-FD (Freed Detainees, 2015–present)
- R-SPLM

As a result of the South Sudanese Civil War in 2013–2014, the SPLM factionalised into the SPLM-Juba, led by President Salva Kiir, and SPLM-IO (in opposition), led by former Vice President Riek Machar.

== Notable people ==
- Abdullah Albert, South Sudanese politician
- Zakaria Chol Gideon Gakmar (1957–2010), Sudanese politician
- Barnaba Okony Gilo, South Sudanese politician
- Rachu Jakin Korok Lom, South Sudanese politician
- Shadrack Bol Machok, South Sudanese politician

== Electoral history ==
=== Sudanese Presidential elections ===
Election	Candidate	Votes	%	Result
2010	Yasir Arman	2,193,826	21.69%	Lost ✗

=== Southern Sudan elections ===
Election	Candidate	Votes	%	Result
2010	Salva Kiir	2,616,613	92.99%	Elected ✓

=== National Assembly elections ===
Election	Leader	Votes	%	Seats	+/–	Position	Result
2010	Yasir Arman			99 / 450	New	2nd	Opposition

=== Southern Sudan Legislative Assembly elections ===
Election	Leader	Votes	%	Seats	+/–	Position	Result
2010	Salva Kiir			161 / 170	New	1st	Supermajority government

== See also ==
- National Congress Party
- National Islamic Front
- Sudanese Socialist Union
