= List of years in South Sudan =

This is a list of years in South Sudan. See also the timeline of South Sudanese history. For only articles about years in South Sudan that have been written, see Category:Years in South Sudan.

== Twenty-first century ==
2010s
2010
2011
2012
2013
2014
2015
2016
2017
2018
2019

2020s
2020
2021
2022
2023
2024
2025
2026
2027
2028
2029

== See also ==
- List of years by country
