= 2026 in South Sudan =

- Decades: 2000s; 2010s; 2020s
- See also: Other events of 2026; Timeline of South Sudanese history

This article lists events in 2026 in South Sudan.

== Incumbents ==
- President: Salva Kiir
- Vice President: Riek Machar

== Events ==
=== January ===
- 19 January – President Salva Kiir dismisses Angelina Teny as interior minister for unspecified reasons and replaces her with Aleu Ayieny Aleu.
- 20 January – SPLA-IO rebels seize the town of Panyume in Central Equatoria.

=== February ===
- 3 February – A drone attack is carried out on a hospital run by Médecins Sans Frontières in Lankien, Jonglei State.
- 27 February – Former finance minister Bak Barnaba Chol is arrested while trying to flee to Uganda.

=== March ===
- 1 March – Abiemnom massacre: At least 169 people are killed in an attack by armed youths linked to rebel faction on Abiemnom County, Ruweng Administrative Area.
- 8 March – The SSPDF orders the evacuation of the town of Akobo in preparation for a military operation. It later claims the recapture of the town on 12 March.
- 26 March – South Sudan announce measures restricting electricity consumption due to the international energy crisis, with the Juba Electric Distribution Company saying the capital will start experiencing daily power cuts] on a "rotational basis".
- 29 March – At least 70 people are killed in clashes at a gold mine in Jebel Iraq, Central Equatoria.

=== April ===
- 7 April – President Kiir dismisses Jemma Nunu Kumba as Speaker of the Transitional National Legislative Assembly and replaces her with Joseph Ngere Paciko.
- 13 April – The SPLM-IO retakes the town of Akobo from government forces.
- 27 April – A Cessna 208 Caravan operated by CityLink Aviation crashes southwest of Juba, after losing communication en route from Yei River County to Juba International Airport; all 14 people on board are killed.
- 30 April – The United Nations Security Council votes to reduce the size of UNMISS from 17,000 personnel to 12,000.

=== May ===
- 7 May – President Kiir dismisses General Paul Nang as army chief, reappointing General Santino Deng Wol.
- 16 May – The first official celebration of SPLA Day is held for the first time since the start of the South Sudanese civil war in 2013.
- 18 May – The first Air Traffic Management Control System in South Sudan is inaugurated following a joint project with the Chinese government.
- 26 May – 2026 Central Africa Ebola epidemic: Canada imposes a mandatory 21-day self-isolation for travelers arriving from Uganda, the Democratic Republic of the Congo, and South Sudan, and suspends visa applications from those countries effective from the next day until 29 August.

=== July ===
- 5 July – Rebels seize Walgak Payman in Jonglei State after killing 44 soldiers.
- 26 July – The Boma-Badingilo Migratory Landscape is designated as a UNESCO World Heritage Site.
- 30 July – President Kiir dismisses Johnny Ohisa as governor of the Bank of South Sudan and reappoints Addis Ababa Othow as his replacement.

=== August ===
- 7 August — A US federal judge approves the Trump administration’s plan to end Temporary Protected Status (TPS) for South Sudanese nationals.
- 24 August – Two Ethiopian U.N. peacekeepers are killed, and seven others injured, when unidentified gunmen ambush a UNMISS patrol travelling to Pajut in Jonglei State.
- 29 August – An attack on a cattle camp in Majak Payam, Warrap State, kills 49 people and injures 33 others.

=== September ===
- 21 September — President Kiir dissolves the transitional government ahead of the general election in December.

=== October ===
- 19 October – At least 153 are killed when a Sudanese drone strike hits a market in the disputed Abyei region.

=== November ===
- 14 November – The National Elections Commission postpones the presidential and parliamentary elections from 22 December 2026 to 11 February 2027.

== Holidays ==
- 1 January – New Year's Day
- 20 March – Eid al-Fitr
- 3 April – Good Friday
- 4 April – Easter Saturday
- 5 April – Easter Sunday
- 6 April – Easter Monday
- 1 May – Labour Day
- 16 May – SPLA Day
- 27 May – Eid al-Adha
- 9 July – Independence Day
- 30 July – Martyrs' Day
- 24 December – Christmas Eve
- 25 December – Christmas Day
- 26 December – Boxing Day

== Deaths ==
- 20 February – Malesh Soro, 48, football manager (national team)
- 19 March – Nicholas Haysom, 73, head of the UN Mission in South Sudan (since 2016).
- 11 August – Kosti Manibe Ngai, 78, politician.
- 27 October – Joseph Lagu, 94, president (1978–1979).

== See also ==
- Common Market for Eastern and Southern Africa
- East African Community
- Community of Sahel–Saharan States
- International Conference on the Great Lakes Region
