= 2024 in South Sudan =

- Decades: 2000s; 2010s; 2020s
- See also: Other events of 2024; Timeline of South Sudanese history

This article lists events in 2024 in South Sudan.

== Incumbents ==
- President: Salva Kiir
- Vice President: Riek Machar

== Events ==
=== March ===
- 18 March – Schools across South Sudan close for the day, as an extreme heat wave hits the country.
- 31 March - 2024 Malakal Airport collision: A Boeing 727 collides with a McDonnell Douglas MD-82 at Malakal Airport, injuring one person.

=== May ===
- 20 May – President Salva Kiir orders the dismissal of Joseph Nguen Monytui as governor of Unity State and his replacement by Riek Tap Long.
- 30 May – Several people are reported killed during clashes inside two internally displaced persons camps in Malakal.

=== July ===
- 10 July – President Salva Kiir orders the dismissal of Awow Daniel Chuang as finance minister and his replacement by Marial Deng Ring.

=== August ===
- 6 August – Two people are killed after Sudanese warplanes enter South Sudanese airspace and bomb the town of Khortumbak in Upper Nile State.
- 9 August – Petronas pulls out of South Sudan after 14 years in operation, citing changes in the industrial environment.
- 15 August – A bill allowing warrantless arrests lapses into law more than 30 days after it was sent to President Kiir on 12 July.
- 19 August – President Salva Kiir orders the dismissal of Joseph Bangasi Bakosoro as presidential affairs minister and his replacement by Chol Mawut Ajonga.
- 25 August – Peter Mabior Riiny Lual resigns as a member of the National Legislature, citing the government's failure to address growing socioeconomic problems.
- 27 August – South Sudan halts the export of oil through Sudan due to the country's ongoing civil war.

=== September ===
- 13 September – Authorities order the postponement of general elections due in December to 22 December 2026, citing the need to complete institutional processes such the creation of a census and a permanent constitution and the registration of political parties.

=== October ===
- 28 October – A cholera outbreak is declared in Renk County, Upper Nile State, with six confirmed cases recorded.

=== November ===
- 21 November – Two people are injured in a shootout between soldiers guarding the residence of former intelligence services chief Akol Koor, who is under house arrest, and the latter's personal bodyguards in Thongpiny, Juba.

=== December ===
- 9 December – President Kiir dismisses General Santino Deng Wol as chief of staff of the army, General Atem Marol Biar as inspector general of police, and James Alic Garang Alic as governor of the Bank of South Sudan. They are replaced by General Paul Nang Majok, General Abraham Peter Manyuat and Johnny Ohisa Damian.

== Holidays ==
- 1 January - New Year's Day
- 29 March - Good Friday
- 30 March - Easter Saturday
- 31 March - Easter Sunday
- 1 April - Easter Monday
- 10 April – Eid al-Fitr
- 1 May – Labour Day
- 16 May – SPLA Day
- 16 June – Eid al-Adha
- 9 July – Independence Day
- 30 July – Martyrs' Day
- 24 December – Christmas Eve
- 25 December – Christmas Day
- December 26 – Boxing Day

== See also ==
- Common Market for Eastern and Southern Africa
- East African Community
- Community of Sahel–Saharan States
- International Conference on the Great Lakes Region
