= 2021 in South Sudan =

- Decades: 2000s; 2010s; 2020s
- See also: Other events of 2021; Timeline of South Sudanese history

This article lists events in 2021 in South Sudan.

== Incumbents ==
- President: Salva Kiir
- Vice President: Riek Machar

== Events ==
Ongoing – COVID-19 pandemic in South Sudan, South Sudanese Civil War, Sudanese nomadic conflicts, ethnic violence in South Sudan

- 15 January – South Sudan offers to mediate a border dispute between Sudan and Ethiopia.
- 4 February – Mel Garang, a spokesperson for the South Sudan Hotel and Catering Association, says that hundreds of politicians from different opposition groups, the ruling party, and the military, have been kicked out of 18 hotels in Juba for unpaid bills amounting to US$50 million (€41 million).
- 16 February – United Nations organizations, including the World Health Organization (WHO) and United Nations International Children's Emergency Fund (UNICEF), launch a second round of polio vaccination targeted at 2.8 million children. Workers have been going from house to house using an oral polio vaccine to inoculate children.
- 3 March – Ten people are killed in a plane crash in Jonglei State, South Sudan,
- 28 March – The Sudanese transitional government and the Sudan People's Liberation Movement-North sign an agreement in the South Sudanese capital of Juba, holding that the new government will maintain the separation of church and state and uphold the right to worship for all religions.
- 28 May – The United Nations Security Council approves a resolution drafted by the United States to extend the arms embargo imposed on South Sudan since 2018 until 31 May 2022, due to the increasing violence and repeated human rights abuses in the country.
- 22 June – South Sudan officially resumes the production of crude oil after a 7-year hiatus. The country's Minister of Petroleum says that production has begun at the Block 5A oil field and that the country is seeking a production of 8,000 barrels per day.
- 9 July – President Salva Kiir promises peace on Independence Day and also offers peace to opponent Riek Machar. A civil war has been fought in South Sudan since 2013 when ethnic differences contributed to an armed conflict that has killed more than 400,000 people. This offer of peace comes after Pope Francis said that he would visit the Christian-majority country if some kind of peace is achieved.
- 7 August – Fights erupt between two rival factions of the SPLA-IO party in South Sudan, resulting in the deaths of 32 people.
- 14 September – South Sudan receives its first shipment of 152,950 doses of the single-dose Janssen COVID-19 vaccine.
- 27 September – Sudan resumes its importation of oil from neighboring South Sudan, which was temporarily halted due to Darfur War-related protests blocking access to Port Sudan.
- 2 November – Five people are dead after a small cargo plane belonging to Optimum Aviation Ltd. crashes shortly after take-off from the airport in Juba.
- December – The World Health Organization begins an investigation into an epidemic causing over 90 deaths caused by an unknown disease in South Sudan.

== Deaths ==
- 26 January – James Gita Hakim, cardiologist
- 26 February – David Manyok Barac Atem, military officer, of COVID-19 in Juba
- 5 April – Paulino Lukudu Loro, Roman Catholic prelate, bishop of El Obeid (1979–1983) and archbishop of Juba (1983–2019)

== See also ==
- COVID-19 pandemic in Africa
- Common Market for Eastern and Southern Africa
- East African Community
- Community of Sahel–Saharan States
- International Conference on the Great Lakes Region
