= 2023 in South Sudan =

- Decades: 2000s; 2010s; 2020s
- See also: Other events of 2023; Timeline of South Sudanese history

This article lists events in 2023 in South Sudan.

== Incumbents ==
- President: Salva Kiir
- Vice President: Riek Machar

== Events ==
Ongoing – COVID-19 pandemic in South Sudan, Aftermath of the South Sudanese Civil War, Sudanese nomadic conflicts, ethnic violence in South Sudan

- 28 January – Nairobi Declaration
- 5 April – An international human development agency says that 13 Jiye/Jie people have died from conditions related to famine in Kapoeta, while hundreds of others are on the verge of starvation.
- 8 June – Malakal refugee camp clashes
- 19 November – At least 32 people are killed and 20 others are injured in a mass shooting against two villages in Abyei, an area that is disputed between Sudan and South Sudan.

== See also ==
- COVID-19 pandemic in Africa
- Common Market for Eastern and Southern Africa
- East African Community
- Community of Sahel–Saharan States
- International Conference on the Great Lakes Region
