= 2027 in South Sudan =

- Decades: 2000s; 2010s; 2020s
- See also: Other events of 2027; Timeline of South Sudanese history

This article lists events in 2027 in South Sudan.

== Incumbents ==
- President: Salva Kiir
- Vice President: Riek Machar

== Events ==
=== February ===
- 11 February – 2027 South Sudanese general election.

== Holidays ==
- 1 January – New Year's Day
- 9 March – Eid al-Fitr
- 26 March – Good Friday
- 27 March – Easter Saturday
- 28 March – Easter Sunday
- 29 March – Easter Monday
- 1 May – Labour Day
- 16 May
  - SPLA Day
  - Eid al-Adha
- 9 July – Independence Day
- 30 July – Martyrs' Day
- 24 December – Christmas Eve
- 25 December – Christmas Day
- 26 December – Boxing Day

== See also ==
- Common Market for Eastern and Southern Africa
- East African Community
- Community of Sahel–Saharan States
- International Conference on the Great Lakes Region
