= 2019 in South Sudan =

- Decades: 2000s; 2010s; 2020s
- See also: Other events of 2019; Timeline of South Sudanese history

This article lists events from the year 2019 in South Sudan

== Incumbents ==
- President: Salva Kiir
- Vice President: James Wani Igga

== Events ==
Ongoing – South Sudanese Civil War, Sudanese nomadic conflicts, ethnic violence in South Sudan

=== January ===
- January 31 – Government forces and the SPLA-IO faction of Riek Machar agree to a ceasefire deal in Wau State, formally ending the 2016–19 Wau clashes.

=== August ===
- August 18 – NAS claims it repulsed an attack by SPLA troops in Loka West, killing 2 SPLA soldiers.
- August 21 – NAS claims it repulsed an attack by SPLA troops and pursued them to Lainya, killing 20 SPLA soldiers and capturing a large amount of ammunition.
- August 27 – Three soldiers were killed in an attack by SS-UF on a SPLA base in Raga, Lol State. The government claims it captured 13 SS-UF soldiers.
- August 28 – The government claims it killed 2 SS-UF and captured 16 without any government casualties.
- August 29 – Two people were killed and one was wounded in inter-clan fighting over a bull in Pakam, Western Lakes State. Authorities in Bieh State confiscated and burned about 1 ton of marijuana in a crackdown on illegal drugs.
- August 30 – Pagan Amum announced the creation of a new party called the Real SPLM, with an ideology like that of the SPLM envisioned by John Garang.
- August 31 – Eight SPLA soldiers and two civilians were killed in Ngap county in Gok State while trying to recover stolen cattle. 2,938 households have been displaced by heavy rain in greater Uror, Bieh State.

=== September ===
- September 2 – Ruweng State speaker of the legislative assembly William Chol Awalith was impeached for absence.
- September 3 – Brig. Gen. Michael Yel Piol and 54 other SS-UF soldiers were captured during clashes in greater Raga County, Lol State. 10 people were killed in after two boats collided at night en route from Juba to Bor. Transport on the Nile between Juba and Jonglei State was suspended for a day.
- September 4 – Soldiers shot and killed a civilian in Waat, Bieh State after he attacked the soldiers while on patrol.
- c. September 5 – South Sudan and Kenya agree on visa-free travel between the two countries, which will come into effect on a later date.
- September 6 – NAS claims it ambushed SPLA troops at Yei-Maridi road, killing 16 and wounding 13 SPLA soldiers.
- September 7 – NAS claims it repulsed attacks by SPLA troops around Yei and Lainya County, killing 25 SPLA soldiers and capturing a large amount of ammunition, with the NAS suffering 5 wounded. The government confirmed the clashes, saying the NAS forces were illegally mining gold, but denied that there were any government casualties.
- September 9 – Riek Machar arrives in Juba to meet with President Salva Kiir
- September 10 – President Salva Kiir and Riek Machar meet in Juba, agreeing that security forces will be screened, a 3,000 strong force called the Republican guard will be created for protecting opposition leaders, and on the formation of a transitional government on November 12. The SPLA-IO decides to relocate its headquarters from Phow State to Juba.
- September 11 – Three civilians were killed by armed youth in Terekeka State.
- September 12 – Clashes between government and opposition forces in Otogo county in the Yei River State have displaced 230 people. The 15th Prime Minister of Sudan, Abdalla Hamdok, arrives in South Sudan for the first time since taking office on August 21.
- September 13 – Sudan and South Sudan agreed to reopen border crossings closed since South Sudanese independence
- September 18 – SPLA troops killed an armed youth in a clash in Maleng-Agok Town in Western Lakes State, with one SPLA soldier also being wounded. The SPLA turned over 21 children captured during fighting with the SS-UF to the Commission for Disarmament, Demobilization and Reintegration in Aweil East State.
- September 19 – Angelo Taban Biajo, the governor of Wau State, removed eight state cabinet ministers from office.
- September 20 – Authorities began the construction of a new airstrip in Tonj State.
- September 22 – Major General James Ochan Puot, the deputy commander of the SPLA-IO 5th Division, and several other officers defected to the government under President Salva Kiir.
- September 23 – Heavy rains block access to cantonment sites in the Mayom area, leaving troops without drinking water and medical supplies.
- September 25 – About 700 weapons have been collected from civilians in Tonj South County, Tonj State since the beginning of September in an attempt to reduce cattle raids. Timothy Taban Juch, the governor of Akobo State, appointed state cabinet officials.
- September 27 – Joseph Ukel, who had been accused of supporting the SPLA-IO in Wau, was banned from leaving Juba. 12 SPLA-IO defect and join Major General James Ochan Puot in response to SPLA-IO attacks on the Cie-waw community in Maiwut State.
- September 28 – Members of the Anuak people ask for their own state in a meeting with President Salva Kiir in Juba. Kiir approves the construction of a primary and secondary school in the Anuak kingdom. 400 families are homeless in Athooc County, Jonglei State, due to flooding.
- September 29 – Lieutenant General Malual Ayom's residence in Juba was attacked by gunmen, resulting in the death of a security guard.

=== October ===
- October 1 – Labor Minister James Hoth Mai announces that government employees have gone unpaid for four months.
- October 3 – Japan gives South Sudan $350,000 to supply water to cantonment sites.
- October 4 – The first army instructors who will train the unified army graduated.
- October 5 – 40 cows were stolen when armed men raided Unbil, Bieh State.
- October 7 – The Philippines imposes a ban on the deployment of workers to South Sudan, citing violence in the country. 420 SPLA-IO soldiers arrive at Luri, near Juba, to form the VIP protection unit called for by the peace deal.
- October 8 – The European Union provides $10.4 million to the UN's World Food Programme in South Sudan.
- October 11 – The United States sanctions the businessmen Ashraf Seed Ahmed Al-Cardinal and Kur Ajing Ater Ajing for corruption in South Sudan.
- October 13–14 South Sudanese tax officials are arrested by Sudanese security agents in Adham, Northern Upper Nile State, without clear reasons.
- October 14 – Kiir hosts peace talks in Juba between the Sudanese government and rebels. Police in Jonglei State suspend the use of boda bodas after a foreign motorcycle operator was attack in Bor. Joseph Ukel arrives in Sudan after being released from confinement in Juba. SPLA-IO soldiers are accused of killing a businessman in Maper Village, Southern Liech State.
- October 15 – The United Nations Security Council extends the mandate for the United Nations Interim Security Force for Abyei with Resolution 2492. Gunmen attacked some internally displaced persons near the United Nations Protection of Civilians site in Juba, killing one person and injuring one other.
- October 19 – Riek Machar arrives in Juba to discuss the November 12 peace deal.
- October 20 – Members of the United Nations Security Council arrive in Juba to encourage the formation of a unity government by November 12.
- October 21 – South Sudan's National Security Services arrests the editor-in-chief of The Dawn newspaper after discussing the appropriateness of a dress Awut Deng Acuil, Minister of Foreign Affairs.
- October 22 – A police convoy is ambushed in Southern Liech State, with two attackers killed and two policemen wounded.
- October 24 – Construction starts on a power line that will provide power from Uganda to the towns of Nimule, Kaya, and Kajo Keji.
- October 27 – Two people are injured after a plane crashes near Bor. Clashes occur between the SPLA and NAS in Morobo County, Yei River State, with the NAS claiming it lost 2 soldiers killed and 5 wounded while killing 17 SPLA soldiers, and the SPLA claiming it suffered 1 soldier killed and 1 wounded while killing 9 NAS troops. Three International Organization for Migration aid workers were killed in the cross-fire during the clashes in the village of Isebi.
- October 28 – Two chiefs from the Panawur clan were killed when attacked by members of the Panaguong clan in Gok State. Two attackers were also killed.
- October 29 – The government of Yei River State bans timber logging due to rapid deforestation. Oil Minister Awow Daniel Chuang announces that 14 new blocks are ready for exploration. Kiir declares a state of emergency in flood-affected parts of South Sudan, mostly in the Bahr el Ghazal and Greater Upper Nile regions.
- October 30 – One person was killed and five were injured in a road ambush in Nyok Lith in the disputed Abyei area. The International Organization for Migration suspends Ebola screening in Isebi, Bazi, Kirikwa, Lasu, and Okaba on the Democratic Republic of the Congo border until the safety of their personnel is guaranteed. A convoy containing Yei River State governor Emmanuel Adil and the Democratic Republic of the Congo's ambassador were attacked on the road near Yei with no casualties.
- October 31 – Two journalists were hit with a tripod by General Malaak Ayuen at the Military Command Council meeting in Juba. Norway donates 30 million kr. to help flood victims.

=== November ===
- November 3 – Between seven and thirteen youth from Gogrial State were arrested at an event in Juba organized by state authorities for criticizing the state government.
- November 6 – Saudi Arabia gives the World Food Programme dates valued at $160,000 to feed school children in the Greater Upper Nile area. Isaac Kuach, the speaker of the Bieh State assembly, is impeached for absenteeism. South Sudan's first Juvenile Reformatory Centre is inaugurated in Juba.
- November 7 – President Salva Kiir and Riek Machar agree to postpone the November 12 formation of a unity government by 100 days during talks in Entebbe. In Abyei, two people were killed and two others injured in Dungop Village, Amenthaguok County and seven people were killed in Rummamer County when attacked by gunmen reportedly from the Messiria ethnic group.
- November 8 – Germany gives the World Food Programme $10.9 million to support humanitarian activities and flood response in South Sudan. A soldier was killed by unknown assailants in Waat, Bieh State
- November 10 – Pope Francis says he wishes to visit South Sudan in 2020. A National Security Services officer kills two policemen in Gok State while trying to release his brother from detention.
- November 12 – Two SPLA soldiers are killed and one is wounded after being ambushed in Lora, Yei River State, on the Yei-Juba road. 16 South Sudanese who were arrested by Sudan when collecting taxes in South Sudan are confirmed to be released.
- November 14 – A journalist was arrested in Western Lakes State for covering corruption. One person is killed and three are wounded after an explosion in Aweil. The United States provides $92.5 million in humanitarian assistance through USAID. The United Nations Security Council extends the mandate of the United Nations Interim Security Force for Abyei until May 15, 2020, with resolution 2497
- November 17 – Three people are killed and seven are wounded when a fuel tanker explodes in Maridi State.
- November 20 – The South Sudan Opposition Movements meet with the Community of Sant'Egidio in Rome.
- November 21 – Juba gets electricity for the first time with the launch of a power plant that will supply electricity to about 50,000 to 70,000 households. The spokesperson for Joseph Bakosoro's South Sudan National Movement for Change, Daniel Zingifuaboro, resigns, saying the group had abandoned its good intentions. Two people are killed and eight United Nations personal are injured by intoxicated youth in Bentiu.
- November 22 – Four girls are abducted in a road ambush in Duk Pagak County, Jonglei State. President Salva Kiir replaces the governor of Latjoor State Elijah Liech Bany with Gen. Gathoth Gatkuoth Hothnyang.
- November 23 – A faction of the SPLM-IO under Gen. Gathoth Gatkuoth Hothnyang formally rejoins the SPLM. Three people are killed in Tonj County, Tonj State by gunmen believed to be from Gok State.
- November 24 – Four people are killed, two are injured, and five children are kidnapped in Bieh State by gunmen believed to be from Boma State.
- November 25 – The United States recalls ambassador Thomas Hushek from South Sudan due to the failure to form a unity government on November 12.
- November 26 – A man is arrested for burning several houses in Aweil East State. Youth in Duk Pagak County, Jonglei State rescue the four girls abducted on November 22 with one person being injured.
- November 27 – A United Nations panel reports that the National Security Service has recruited a force of at least 10,000 fighters from former Warrap State that has been training in Tonj County since August in violation of the peace agreement. Twenty-three people are killed and forty-seven are wounded in clashes between the Gak and Manuer sections of the Pakam community in Maper, Aloor county, Western Lakes State.
- November 28 – Sudan and South Sudan extend an oil transit deal that allows South Sudan to export its oil through Sudan until March 2022.
- November 29 – The IGAD calls for the international community to lift sanctions on Sudan and South Sudan A fire in Omoliha market in Torit causes millions of pounds worth of damage and one injury. Two civilians and 12 SPLA soldiers are killed and five soldiers and four civilians are killed in Naapagok County, Tonj State while the soldiers were conducting disarmament. 13 people are killed from the Manuer section and 17 people are killed from the Gak section during renewed clashes in Aloor county, Western Lakes State. Officials in the Blue Nile state in Sudan release seven employees of South Sudan's Finance ministry detained since October in return for the release of five soldiers arrested by Northern Upper Nile State authorities.
- November 30 – A traffic policeman is killed by armed men on the Yei-Kaya road in Yei River State.

=== December ===
- December 1 – Armed men storm the Relief International compound in Bunj, Maban County, Northern Upper Nile State, assaulting five staffers and stealing valuables.
- December 2 – Chief Mading Anhimen is killed in a cattle raid in Eastern Lakes State in which bandits from Western Lakes State stole more than 200 cows.
- December 3 – UNMISS flies 75 Nepalese troops from Rumbek to Maper, Western Lakes State to halt inter-communal clashes.
- December 4 – Government and opposition negotiators finish three days of meetings on the number of states without consensus and agree to meet again in 10 days. 29 people are killed and about 20 are wounded after clashes over the ownership of Chuetakwet island along the Nile river between youth from Jonglei State and Eastern Lakes State.
- December 5 – The International Committee of the Red Cross evacuates 29 people suffering from gunshot wounds from the clashes in Western Lakes State. South Sudan launches its first veterinary diagnostic laboratory to help combat livestock diseases.
- December 6 – Youth from Jonglei State vacate Chuetakwet island until the dispute is resolved. Authorities in Tambura State accuse SPLA-IO forces of kidnapping youth after two youth escaped from Nabiama. Seven civilians are killed in clashes between SPLA-IO forces and civilians loyal to the Provisional Military and Political Council near Jikou, Maiwut State.
- December 8 – Anthony Lino Makana resigns as speaker of National Legislative Assembly. Three people are killed and twelve wounded after armed youth from the Rup community raided about 200 cows from the Pakam community in Cuei-adukan, Amongpiny County, Western Lakes State.
- December 10 – Wau municipality bans Shisha smoking due to adverse health effects. The United States sanctions Abud Stephen Thiongkol, Malual Dhal Muorwel, Michael Kuajien, John Top Lam, and Angelo Kuot Garang for the alleged kidnapping and execution of SPLM-IO member Aggrey Idri and human rights lawyer Dong Samuel Luak in Nairobi in January 2017.
- December 11–9 people are killed and 11 injured in clashes over whether the name of Lou County in Tonj State should by Lou or Alabek.
- December 13 – Italy donates €1 million to help with flooding in South Sudan. NAS claims that it was attacked by the SPLA around Lasu Payam and Mitika, Yei River State, and that it repulsed the attacks in two days of fighting and killed 19 SPLA soldiers. The SPLA claims instead that its positions around Lasu were attacked twice and the NAS was repulsed and it returned to the Democratic Republic of the Congo. Two people are injured and 320 are stolen in a cattle raid in Patuet, Duk Panyang County, Jonglei State.
- December 15 – Two children are abducted in a road ambush near Jebel Muluk, Imatong State, by armed youth believed to be from Boma State. Seven people are killed and two are injured when attackers from Boma State steal 1,000 cows in Paliou, Jonglei State.
- December 16 – Obuch Ojok becomes the new National Legislative Assembly speaker. The United States sanctions Minister of Cabinet Affairs Martin Elia Lomuro and Minister of Defence and Veteran Affairs Kuol Manyang Juuk for allegedly fomenting conflict. The minister of finance for Yei River State, Lona Sadia, resigns after being impeached for corruption. An SPLA officer is killed by armed youth in the Atiaba area, Eastern Bahr Naam County, Eastern Lakes State while traveling to Rumbek.
- December 17 – Salva Kiir and Riek Machar end days of meetings without a breakthrough on the number of states.
- December 21 – A leaking oil pipeline at Kailoy, in the Unity State area, catches fire and burns for two days. Aweil East State moves its capital from Malualkon to a newly built building in Wanyjok due to high rent in the previous location.
- December 22 – Two people are killed and three others injured in resumed fighting over Chuetakwet island that continued until December 23.
- December 23 – South Korea donates US$500,000 to the World Food Programme for refugees in South Sudan. The Joint Military Ceasefire Commission begins sending forces to training centers to form the united army.
- December 24 – A man is killed in a cattle raid in Abiemnohm East County, Ruweng State.
- December 25 – Six traders are killed, twelve others are injured, and about 1,400 cattle are stolen in Gok State by gunmen believed to be from Western Lakes State. A National Security officer is injured in a stabbing attack in Tambura, Tambura State.
- December 26 – National Security Service agents shoot and kill a man at Aru Junction, Jubek State. A man is killed and 800 cows are stolen in Ajakuac County, Twic State by attackers believed to be from Northern Liech State. A man is killed and 350 cows are stollen in the Buongjok area, Duk Padiet County, Jonglei State by attackers from Boma State.
- December 28 – A fire at Marol Market in Bor destroys six shops and much property.
- December 31 – NAS says it released 23 people under its control to the International Committee of the Red Cross.

== Deaths ==
- April 15 – Peter Gadet, leader of the South Sudan Liberation Movement
- July 4 – General Johnson Gony, SPLA commander and governor of Akobo State since January 2017 (b. 1960)
- October 30 – Lt. General Peter Cirillo, Anyanya commander and governor of Equatoria in the 1980s
- November 9 – Charles Manyang Awuol, career diplomat and speaker of the Jonglei State Legislative Assembly

== Links ==
Media related to 2019 in South Sudan at Wikimedia Commons
