= 2025 in South Sudan =

- Decades: 2000s; 2010s; 2020s
- See also: Other events of 2025; Timeline of South Sudanese history

This article lists events in 2025 in South Sudan.

== Incumbents ==
- President: Salva Kiir
- Vice President: Riek Machar

== Events ==
=== January ===
- 17 January – A nationwide nighttime curfew is imposed following riots targeting Sudanese nationals and their businesses that leave 16 Sudanese dead.
- 22 January –
  - More than 600 people arrested during the anti-Sudanese riots escape from a military detention facility in Juba.
  - The government imposes a 30-day block on social media in response to the anti-Sudanese riots.
- 29 January – 2025 Light Air Services Beechcraft 1900 crash: A small aircraft chartered by Chinese oil firm Greater Pioneer Operating Company crashes during takeoff near an oil field in Unity State, killing all but one of its 21 passengers and crew.

=== February ===
- 3 February – The government signs a peace agreement with a rebel group led by Simon Gatwech Dual in a ceremony in Sudan in which Gatwech's group would be integrated into the South Sudan People's Defence Forces.
- 7 February – An outbreak of mpox is declared by the health ministry after a Ugandan national residing in Juba tests positive for the disease.
- 10 February –
  - President Salva Kiir implements a cabinet reshuffle that results in the transfer of James Wani Igga as second vice president to become secretary-general of the Sudan People's Liberation Movement. He is replaced as second vice president by Benjamin Bol Mel. Meanwhile, fifth vice president Hussein Abdelbagi is replaced by Josephine Joseph Lagu and becomes agriculture minister, while Yolanda Awel Deng is dismissed as health minister.
  - Western Equatoria governor Alfred Futuyo Karaba is reported to have gone into hiding after a shooting near his residence in Yambio shortly after being dismissed from his position by President Kiir earlier in the day.
- 16 February – Ten soldiers are killed in an ambush blamed on armed youths in Nasir, Upper Nile State.
- 18 February – President Kiir orders the dismissal of Francis Marial Abur as governor of Warrap State and Chol Deng Alak as chief administrator of the Abyei Administrative Area. They are replaced by Magok Magok Deng and Charles Abyei Jok respectively.
- 20 February – The government orders a two-week closure of schools nationwide due to a heatwave.

=== March ===
- 3 March – 2025 Nasir clashes: Clashes break out in the town of Nasir between members of the South Sudan People's Defence Forces and the Nuer White Army.
- 4 March – Deputy army chief General Gabriel Duop Lam is arrested on unspecified charges.
- 5 March – Petroleum Minister Puot Kang Chol is arrested on unspecified charges.
- 7 March – A UN helicopter evacuating soldiers near Nasir is attacked, killing 27 people including a UN crew member and a South Sudanese general.
- 16 March – At least 12 civilians are reported to have been killed in an airstrike in Nasir County.
- 17 March – The government orders the evacuation of civilians from Nasir County due to clashes with the Nuer White Army.
- 18 March – The SPLM-IO suspends its participation in the peace process, citing deteriorating relations between Riek Machar and President Salva Kiir amid clashes and arrests.
- 22 March – Germany closes its embassy in Juba amid concerns over the conflict in South Sudan.
- 24 March – The deputy governor of Lakes State, Isaiah Akol Mathiang, is arrested on charges of insubordination and incitement believed to be connected to his opposition to the arrest of SPLM-IO officials.
- 26 March –
  - Vice President Riek Machar and his wife, interior minister Angelina Teny, are arrested in their residence in Juba, prompting the SPLM-IO to announce the end of the 2018 peace agreement terminating the South Sudanese Civil War.
  - Norway temporarily closes its embassy in Juba amid concerns over the conflict in South Sudan.

=== April ===
- 5 April – The United States cancels all visas issued to South Sudanese nationals and halts the approval of visa applications after the US State Department accuses Juba of refusing to repatriate a Congolese national deported from the US.

=== May ===
- 3 May – Seven people are killed in an airstrike on a hospital operated by Médecins Sans Frontières in Fangak.

=== June ===
- 5 June – Eight men deported from the US, including one South Sudanese, arrive in Juba escorted by US marines.
- 17 June – The first court martial of the SSPDF is inaugurated in Wau.

=== July ===
- 7 July – President Kiir dismisses Paul Nang Majok as commander of the SSPDF and replaces him with Dau Aturjong.
- 28 July – At least four SSPDF soldiers are killed in clashes with Ugandan soldiers along the South Sudan–Uganda border in Central Equatoria.

=== August ===
- 18 August – Israel announces it would send urgent humanitarian aid to South Sudan including medical equipment, water purification supplies, and food to address the cholera outbreak there, amid reports that Israel was in talks with the Government of South Sudan about resettling people from the Gaza Strip in South Sudan.
- 28 August – One rebel fighter and two soldiers are reported killed following clashes between the SSPDF and the Sudan People's Liberation Movement-in-Opposition (SPLA-IO) in Western Equatoria and Upper Nile States.

=== September ===
- 6 September – The South Sudanese government repatriates a Mexican national who had been deported and sent to South Sudan by the United States in July.
- 11 September – Vice President Riek Machar is charged with murder, treason and crimes against humanity over the 2025 Nasir clashes. He is suspended from office by President Kiir, and his treason trial begins in Juba on 22 September under tight security.

=== October ===
- 9 October – President Kiir dismisses Dau Aturjong as commander of the SSPDF and reinstates his predecessor, Paul Nang Majok.

=== November ===
- 4 November – President Kiir fires Finance Minister Athian Diing Athian after two months, appointing Barnaba Bak Chol as his replacement.
- 12 November – President Kiir dismisses Benjamin Bol Mel as vice president for unspecified reasons.
- 25 November – An aircraft operated by Nari Air that was carrying food aid on behalf of Samaritan's Purse crashes in Leer County, killing all three crew members on board.

=== December ===
- 2 December – 2025 Samaritan's Purse Cessna 208 hijacking: A gunman demanding to be flown to Chad hijacks a Cessna Grand Caravan aircraft owned by Samaritan's Purse that was carrying out a humanitarian relief mission from Juba to Maiwut County. He is arrested at Wau Airport during a refueling stop.
- 10 December – The SSPDF deploys personnel to secure the Heglig oilfield in neighboring Sudan following a "tripartite agreement" involving president Kiir, Sudanese Armed Forces commander Abdel Fattah al-Burhan, and Rapid Support Forces commander Hemedti to secure vital energy infrastructure in the area amid the Sudanese civil war (2023–present).
- 15 December –
  - The government grounds four aircraft used by the United Nations on suspicion of usage for illegal surveillance and smuggling.
  - A UN interpreter is abducted and later killed by SSPDF soldiers from a UN vehicle outside Wau. Two suspects are arrested.
- 16 December – US President Donald Trump issues a proclamation barring South Sudanese nationals from entering the United States.

== Holidays ==
- 1 January – New Year's Day
- 30 March – Eid al-Fitr
- 18 April – Good Friday
- 19 April – Easter Saturday
- 20 April – Easter Sunday
- 21 April – Easter Monday
- 1 May – Labour Day
- 16 May – SPLA Day
- 6 June – Eid al-Adha
- 9 July – Independence Day
- 30 July – Martyrs' Day
- 24 December – Christmas Eve
- 25 December – Christmas Day
- 26 December – Boxing Day

== Deaths ==
- 2 November – Bona Malwal, 97, journalist (The Vigilant) and politician, minister of information of Sudan (1973–1978)

== See also ==
- Common Market for Eastern and Southern Africa
- East African Community
- Community of Sahel–Saharan States
- International Conference on the Great Lakes Region
