= 2022 in South Sudan =

- Decades: 2000s; 2010s; 2020s
- See also: Other events of 2022; Timeline of South Sudanese history

This article lists events in 2022 in South Sudan.

== Incumbents ==
- President: Salva Kiir
- Vice President: Riek Machar

== Events ==
Ongoing – COVID-19 pandemic in South Sudan, South Sudanese Civil War, Sudanese nomadic conflicts, ethnic violence in South Sudan

- 24 January – At least 31 ethnic Dinka people are killed in clashes with suspected Murle armed youth in Jonglei State, South Sudan.
- 24 March – The Sudan People's Liberation Movement-in-Opposition (SPLM-IO) is accused by the South Sudanese military of attacking government positions in Longechuk County. The SPLM-IO says that the military attacked first, causing it to clash with authorities.
- 14 April – At least 42 people are killed during attacks by Arab militiamen in the disputed area of Abyei between Sudan and South Sudan.
- 11 October – The UN Office for the Coordination of Humanitarian Affairs says that renewed fighting between tribes has displaced more than 8,000 civilians in South Sudan.
- 22 December – Footage of the President of South Sudan Salva Kiir urinating on himself during a national event sparks a widespread debate about ethics, age, health, governance and retirement.

== See also ==
- COVID-19 pandemic in Africa
- Common Market for Eastern and Southern Africa
- East African Community
- Community of Sahel–Saharan States
- International Conference on the Great Lakes Region
