= Malwal (disambiguation) =

Bona Malwal (1928–2025) was a South Sudanese journalist and politician.

Malwal could also refer to:

- Malwal, India, a village in Punjab state, India
- Malwal River, a river in South Sudan
