= Capital punishment in the Democratic Republic of the Congo =

Capital punishment in the Democratic Republic of the Congo is a legal penalty. In 2019, officials in the nation's parliament discussed abolition of the death penalty, but in March 2024, the government announced their intent to resume executions in an attempt to combat militant violence in the country.

== Execution methods and death penalty law ==
Per a decree passed in 1898, people found guilty of civilian crimes are executed by hanging, while military crimes are punished with execution by shooting. The DRC penal code permits the President to designate the method of execution. In 1936, a law was passed forbidding the photographing of executions; public executions are forbidden in the country without the President's approval.

== Colonial history ==
In 1921, Simon Kimbangu, a Congolese religious leader, was tried by a military court for "undermining public security" and "disturbing the peace." He was not offered legal counsel. He was convicted and sentenced to death on 3 October 1921, but before his execution could be carried out, King Albert I of Belgium commuted his sentence to life. Kimbangu died in a prison in Lubumbashi (then known Elizabethville) in 1951 after serving 30 years of a life sentence.

== 1998–2001: Pre-moratorium developments ==
On 28 January 1998, United Nations officials published a report stating that 21 executions had been carried out in Kinshasa, the first mass executions since then-President Laurent-Désiré Kabila took power. Although the condemned consisted of both civilians and military men, and although the crimes were civilian crimes such as armed robbery and murder, all of the executions were carried out by firing squad. Following the executions, the military tribunal which had condemned the men issued a statement declaring that the executions should be viewed "as a solemn warning to any potential delinquent."

In May 1999, Amnesty International published a report revealing that the DRC had seen at least 46 executions since April 1999. The report also found that there were over 100 executions in the DRC in 1998 alone and that, in 1998, the DRC was only second to China in the number of known executions that year. There were a reported 13 executions for crimes ranging from armed robbery to murder in Mbuji-Mayi, Kasaï-Oriental, on 13 April 1999, as well as 20 executions of soldiers in Lubumbashi on 6 May; the soldiers had been convicted of military offenses, including defection. There were also 15 executions confirmed to have taken place in Kinshasa on 13 May, with all of the condemned having been convicted of violent crimes. Amnesty reported that many of the trials preceding those executions were unfair, with many of the convicted not having access to legal counsel, and for those who did have access to attorneys, many of their lawyers did not have sufficient time to prepare for the case or examine the evidence against their clients. Some of the executions took place within a few days of the end of the trial, and others took place within hours of the end of the trial, leading to doubts that then-President Kabila had ample time to consider any clemency appeals. Only one inmate who appealed for clemency, a 15-year-old child soldier, received a commutation of their sentence from then-President Kabila. Amnesty also found that military courts were increasingly and inappropriately being used in civilian trials for the purposes of political repression, including for nonviolent protests against the DRC's government.

In a later report, Amnesty also found that 11 people had been publicly executed in Mbuji-Mayi on 28 July 1999 despite the long-standing law forbidding public executions. The same report found that one woman, Charlotte Ngoy, was scheduled to be executed and escaped the death penalty minutes before her execution was scheduled to occur; Ngoy had been sentenced to death for criminal association because she had lived with an armed robber.

In 2001, six Congolese soldiers were executed. Their identities and the crimes of which they were convicted were not revealed. In September of the same year, 13 soldiers were convicted of plotting to overthrow the government and were sentenced to death, but none of them were executed, and the Minister of Human Rights, Ntumba Luaba, announced that their death sentences would be commuted to prison terms.

== 2003–present: Recent developments ==
The last executions to take place in the Democratic Republic of the Congo occurred in January 2003. It was a mass execution of 15 people; the British Broadcasting Corporation reported that eight of those executed were by mistake.

While death sentences are still routinely handed down in the nation, they are frequently commuted to life imprisonment.

In May 2010, two soldiers and a civilian were sentenced to death for murdering Didace Namujimbo, a journalist working for the United Nations-supported broadcaster Radio Okapi, in November 2008. The trials were referred to as "sham trials," with the three condemned men's attorneys receiving death threats, and the United Nations condemned the trials and death sentences.

On 13 May 2021, a police officer was killed in Kinshasa during a period of upheaval following the end of Ramadan. Forty-one people were brought to trial one day after the killing. Their trial lasted one day, and 29 of them were convicted of murder and sentenced to death, with the death sentences formally being pronounced that Saturday, 15 May. Two received 5-year prison sentences. The trial proceedings were televised.

On 12 March 2017, two United Nations representatives, Swedish national Zaida Catalán and American national Michael Sharp, were ambushed by pro-Kamwina Nsapu militiamen while investigating violence in the Kasaï Province. The armed men marched them into a field and killed Catalán and Sharp; their bodies were discovered 16 days later, on 28 March, with Catalán having also been beheaded. A report given to the United Nations Security Council stated that the ambush was a "premeditated setup" to exact revenge against the UN for failing to protect them against the Congolese military and that members of state security may have been involved, but no one who was purported to have ordered the act ever went to trial. While 22 of the perpetrators were never apprehended, all 54 of the people believed to be involved were tried in a military court in Kananga, Kasaï-Central; they were charged with crimes ranging from "terrorism" and "murder," to "participation in an insurrection" and "the act of a war crime through mutilation." Prosecutors demanded the death penalty against 51 of the 54 on trial, and all 51 of them received the death penalty on 29 January 2022; twenty-two of them were fugitives and therefore received the death penalty in absentia. Two of those who went to trial, including a journalist, were acquitted of all charges.

Days after the convictions and death sentences, the United Nations requested that the DRC continue their de facto moratorium on the death penalty, stating, "We reiterate the Secretary-General’s opposition to the use of the death penalty in all circumstances. . . . Noting that there is a de facto moratorium on the imposition of the death penalty in the DRC, we urge the DRC authorities to maintain the moratorium on the death penalty and to consider abolishing it in law."

=== 2019–present: Abolition bill and reinstatement ===
On 21 August 2019, National Assembly member André Mbata introduced a private member's bill to abolish the death penalty. The National Assembly research unit was tasked with examining the bill. Approximately three months later, on 12 December 2019, members of the Parliament of the Democratic Republic of the Congo met to discuss plans to promote the abolition of capital punishment.

In March 2024, a circular from the Justice Minister Rose Mutombo Kiese declared that effective immediately, the death penalty would be imposed and carried out in cases of treason, war crimes, crimes against humanity, espionage, rebellion and criminal conspiracy, along with other offenses. It would also be used for the military, for those who rebel against orders or desert and join the enemy ranks. The decision faced significant criticism from human rights organizations and activists, who argued that the death penalty would not effectively address the root causes of violence and could lead to human rights abuses and unjust executions. ECPM, a French organization, called for the "non-instrumentalization" of the death penalty and said it could be used as a tool of "political repression". The government justified the decision for the removal of "traitors" from the army and to curb "urban terrorism". In May 2024, a military court sentenced 8 soldiers to death for cowardice and crimes related to fleeing the battlefield. On 6 January 2025, it was reported by the Associated Press that 102 men had been executed by Congolese government in the past week, in a statement from the Minister of Justice. The statement also mentioned that seventy more people are set to be executed as well. The government said the men were "armed robbers" and "urban bandits". They were executed at the Angenga prison in northwest Congo. The decision was welcomed by some residents in the city of Goma.

== Investigative report ==
In 2020, an investigative report by Prison Insider and the World Coalition Against the Death Penalty revealed that there were at least 510 individuals sentenced to death in the nation, with this number doubling the group's previous estimations. The report consisted of interviews of inmates nationwide who reported being condemned to death. The youngest condemned person interviewed was 20, while the oldest was 70, and the median age of a death row inmate was 40. At least one woman was interviewed, although a significant majority of death row inmates in the nation were men. Approximately 44 percent of death row inmates had received their death sentences after 2015, while 16 percent of death row inmates received their death sentences between 2000 and 2015. The report also found that at least five people had received death sentences when under the age of 18, despite the revised Military Code of Justice in 2002 prohibiting the execution of people who were convicted of crimes that occurred when they were minors.

Previously, the Congolese government had informed human rights organizations that only 26 people were sentenced to death in the DRC between 2006 and 2017, but those organizations found that the actual number of death sentences in that time frame was approximately 268, and that there were approximately 156 death sentences passed between 2016 and 2019. Congolese officials also stated that the majority of death sentences resulted from convictions for premeditated murder, rebellion, crimes against humanity, and war crimes, while the survey results showed that 48 percent of people were sentenced to death for criminal association, 45 percent were sentenced for unpremeditated and premeditated murders, 29 percent were sentenced for armed robbery, 12 percent were sentenced for participating in an insurgent group, and 9 percent were sentenced to death for financial extortion.

While 66 percent of interviewees had some form of legal representation at trial, many of those stated that they did not receive sufficient legal aid, with many having inexperienced lawyers and others having their attorneys leave them mid-trial due to lack of financial compensation by their clients; others met their clients on the day of the trial with no means of prior preparation. Several of them were not offered interpreters in spite of language barriers during court proceedings, and others reported that members of law enforcement had coerced confessions from them. In spite of the Congolese penal code guaranteeing universal legal representation for all inmates, 34 percent of interviewees said they had not been able to afford a lawyer at all and were not provided one during their trials. The study concluded that "the funds allocated for legal aid are generally unavailable at the free consultation offices of the Bar Association. Lawyers and advocates therefore do not have the resources to prepare files and organize the defense of their clients."
