= 2016 in South Sudan =

- Decades: 2000s; 2010s; 2020s
- See also: Other events of 2016; Timeline of South Sudanese history

Events in the year 2016 in South Sudan.

== Incumbents ==
- President: Salva Kiir
- Vice President: James Wani Igga
- First Vice President: Riek Machar (April–July), Taban Deng Gai (from 23 July)

== Events ==
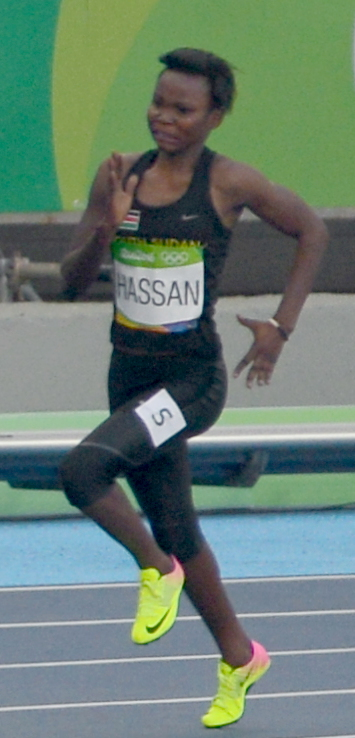
Margret Hassan competing in the women's 200 m at the 2016 Summer Olympics.

South Sudanese Civil War continues.

- 23 June – a larger battle south of Wau initiated the 2016–17 Wau clashes.
- 7-11 July – in the Juba clashes, a total of 300 people were killed.
- 9 July – Coins for £1 SSP and £2 SSP are released to complete the coin series of the South Sudanese pound.

=== Sport ===
- 5-21 August – South Sudan at the 2016 Summer Olympics: 3 competitors in 1 sport (athletics).

== Deaths ==
- 15 March – Arkangelo Bari Wanji, politician (b. 1936).
