= 2020 in South Sudan =

- Decades: 2000s; 2010s; 2020s
- See also: Other events of 2020; Timeline of South Sudanese history

This article lists events from the year 2020 in South Sudan

== Incumbents ==
- President: Salva Kiir
- Vice President: Riek Machar

== Events ==
Ongoing – South Sudanese Civil War, Sudanese nomadic conflicts, ethnic violence in South Sudan

- 8 January – The United States announces sanctions against First Vice President Taban Deng Gai of South Sudan for human rights violations.
- 10 February – There still is no agreement in South Sudan over the number and boundaries of its states. A week later talks are still stalled.
- 13 February – The government of South Sudan is accused of ignoring four reports linking oil pollution and birth defects in Upper Nile and Unity states.
- 19 February – Locust swarms spread from Uganda to South Sudan.
- 20 February – The government and rebels reach a peace agreement in South Sudan.
- 5 April – The first case of COVID-19 in the country was confirmed in a 29-year-old patient, a United Nations worker, who arrived on 28 February from the Netherlands.
- 14 May – The first death from COVID-19 occurs in the country.
- 16 May – Sudan People's Liberation Army Day, South Sudan
- 18 May – First Vice President Riek Machar announced he and his wife, Angelina Teny, had tested positive for the virus.
- 19 May – Information Minister Michael Makuei Lueth and all members of the nation's 15-member coronavirus task force tested positive for COVID-19.
- 4 August – Olympic track and field athlete Yiech Pur Biel was named a United Nations Goodwill Ambassador for the United Nations High Commissioner for Refugees (UNHCR).
- 9 August – Violence erupted when South Sudan People's Defence Forces members attempted to disarm civilians at a market in Tonj East, leading to at least seventy people being killed.
- 10 August – Armed civilians attacked a South Sudan People's Defence Forces base in the town of Romich, where they also looted a market.
- September – Two soldiers are convicted of rape and 24 on other charges for crimes committed in Yei, Central Equatoria in May of this year.
- 11 December – International food security experts from the Famine Review Committeesaid in December 2020 that Pibor County was likely in a famine. Flooding and violence have prevented access to aid.
- 31 December – One million people have been displaced by floods since June. Food shortages, malaria, and diarrheal diseases spread.

== Deaths ==
- 4 January – Oliver Batali Albino, 84, South Sudanese politician
- 2 June – John Luk Jok, 68, South Sudanese politician, Minister of Justice (2011–2013).

== See also ==
- COVID-19 pandemic in South Sudan
- COVID-19 pandemic in Africa
- 2020 in East Africa
- 2020 in Sudan
- 2020 in Ethiopia
- 2020 in Kenya
- 2020 in Middle Africa
