= Adok =

- Location in South Sudan
- Coordinates: 8.188526°N 30.30688°E
- Country: South Sudan
- Region: Greater Upper Nile
- State: Unity State
- County: Leer County
  - Summer (DST): +3GMT
- Climate: Aw

Adok is a port on the White Nile in the Leer County of Unity State in the Greater Upper Nile region of South Sudan. In the early 1980s Chevron Corporation found oil in Adok.

Adok had strategic value during the Second Sudanese Civil War (1983–2005). Between October and December 1991 the town was the scene of fighting between the Nasir and Torit factions of the Sudan People's Liberation Army (SPLA). In the late 1990s the Austrian company OMV began explorations in the Leer-Adok area. Between December 2002 and early February 2003 the government made a renewed push to clear the road south from Bentiu to the port of Adok.

== Sources ==
- Johnson, Douglas Hamilton (2003). The root causes of Sudan's civil wars. Indiana University Press. ISBN 0-253-21584-6.
- Pigott, Peter (2009). Canada in Sudan: war without borders. Dundurn Press Ltd. p. 120. ISBN 978-1-55002-849-2.
- Rone, Jemera (2003). Sudan, oil, and human rights. Human Rights Watch. p. 183. ISBN 1-56432-291-2.
- "Sudan's Oilfields Burn Again: Brinkmanship Endangers the Peace Process" (PDF). AFRICA Briefing. International Crisis Group. 10 February 2003.
