= Gatluak Gai =

South Sudanese rebel (died 2011)

- Born: South Sudan
- Military career
- Allegiance: Sudan People's Liberation Army

Gatluak Gai (died 23 July 2011) was a member of the Sudan People's Liberation Army (SPLA) who rebelled after the April 2010 elections and led a renegade militia in the volatile Unity state of South Sudan.

Gatluak was of Nuer origin, from Koch County. He was a relatively junior SPLA officer on the payroll of the Unity state prisons department. He was said to have wanted to become the Koch county commissioner, but lost this opportunity when Taban Deng Gai was appointed governor of Unity state in 2008. In the April 2010 general elections, Taban Deng Gai successfully defended his governorship against challenger Angelina Teny, wife of South Sudan vice president Riek Machar. Gatluak Gai did not accept the election results, which were widely seen as flawed. Although Angelina Teny disputed the election results, she disclaimed any connection with Gatluak Gai's rebellion.

In late May 2010, Gatluak Gai's forces attacked an SPLA base at Awarping in Abiemnom County. It was suspected that Gatluak Gai led the forces responsible for attacks that killed over 35 people, including many civilians, in Koch County. Gai was residing in Khartoum at this time. There were conflicting rumors about the sources of Gai's forces and arms. As of January 2011 talks were in progress with different people who claimed to represent Gai, but the situation was extremely obscure. Gai signed a peace agreement with the SPLA on 20 July 2011. He would have rejoined the SPLA as a lieutenant general. Three days later he was shot to death in Koch county. At first the SPLA was blamed for the death. However, on 24 July, Marko Chuol Ruei, second in command of the rebel South Sudan Liberation Army (SSLA), said he had killed Gai. Ruei claimed that Gai had told his forces to ignore the peace agreement, to not join the SPLA but instead to join forces from North Sudan. Ruei said the SSLA had been negotiating with Khartoum for supply of munitions, but had been told they would first have to join the rebel militias led by Peter Gadet and Bapiny Monytuel.

At the time of his death, Gatluak Gai was in his 50s. He had an imposing, physical presence. Another rebel leader, General Peter Gadet, was married to one of Gai's daughters.
