= 2018 in South Sudan =

- Decades: 2000s; 2010s; 2020s
- See also: Other events of 2018; Timeline of South Sudanese history

Events in the year 2018 in South Sudan.

== Incumbents ==
- President: Salva Kiir
- Vice President: James Wani Igga

== Events ==
- Ongoing – Sudanese nomadic conflicts
- Ongoing since June 2016 – armed clashes in Wau State between the Dinka-dominated Sudan People's Liberation Army (SPLA) and local opposition forces.
- 9 September – Yirol Let L-410 Turbolet crash

== Deaths ==
- 20 April – James Ajonga Mawut, army commander (b. 1961).
