= 2011 in South Sudan =

- Decades: 2000s; 2010s; 2020s
- See also: Other events of 2011; Timeline of South Sudanese history

The following lists events that happened during 2011 in South Sudan.

== Incumbents ==
- President: Salva Kiir (starting 9 July)
- Vice President: Riek Machar (starting 9 July)

== Events ==
=== January ===
- January 4 - Sudanese President Omar al-Bashir goes to Juba to meet with Southern Sudanese President of the Government Salva Kiir ahead of Southern Sudan's independence referendum.
- January 7 - The United Nations says thousands of people are arriving in Southern Sudan from north Sudan ahead of the independence referendum on Sunday.
- January 8 - Several people are killed in clashes with security forces in Southern Sudan, a day before the independence referendum.
- January 10 - 36 people killed, including possibly 20 police, as Southern Sudan votes on referendum on independence.
- January 13 - The independence referendum is confirmed to have had a turnout above the necessary threshold needed for it to be valid.
- January 15 - The independence referendum ends.
- January 16 - Southern Sudanese leader Salva Kiir calls on the people of South Sudan to forgive the north for killings during the civil war.
- January 26 - The preliminary results of the referendum on an independence for Southern Sudan will be announced in the next few days, with final results as early as February 7; most of the count in the south already completed shows 99% voted for independence.
- January 31 - Southern Sudan announces it plans to officially declare independence from Sudan on July 9, 2011.

=== February ===
- February 2 - The Sudanese government, in its first official reaction after preliminary results were announced indicating a landslide vote in favor of Southern Sudan's independence, agrees to accept the results; Vice-President Ali Osman Taha says the government intends "to pursue a policy of good neighbourly relations with the south".
- February 5 - At least 20 people are killed in a shootout among the military in Malakal.
- February 7 - The official results of the independence referendum are announced, with 98.83% of voters voting for independence.

=== July ===
- July 9 - South Sudan becomes an independent republic.
- July 14 - South Sudan is admitted to the United Nations.
- July 18 - The Sudanese pound is replaced by the South Sudanese pound, which is released in the form of banknotes for £1 SSP, £5 SSP, £10 SSP, £25 SSP, £50 SSP, and £100 SSP.
