= 2013 in South Sudan =

- Decades: 2000s; 2010s; 2020s
- See also: Other events of 2013; Timeline of South Sudanese history

This article lists events in 2013 in South Sudan.

== Incumbents ==
- President: Salva Kiir
- Vice President: Riek Machar (until 23 July), vacant (from 23 July until 25 August), James Wani Igga (from 25 August)

== Events ==
- 15 December – President Salva Kiir accuses his former deputy Riek Machar and ten others of attempting a coup d'état, leading to the start of the South Sudanese Civil War.
