= 2012 in South Sudan =

- Decades: 2000s; 2010s; 2020s
- See also: Other events of 2012; Timeline of South Sudanese history

The following lists events that happened during 2012 in the Republic of South Sudan.

== Incumbents ==
- President: Salva Kiir
- Vice President: Riek Machar

== Events ==
=== January ===
- January 1 - South Sudan is to send more troops and police to Pibor, the scene of ethnic violence.
- January 2 - Up to 50,000 people flee their homes in a border area of South Sudan amid ethnic violence.
- January 12 - South Sudan deposited the instruments of ratification for both the Vienna Convention for the Protection of the Ozone Layer and Montreal Protocol, for ratification to take effect April 11.
- January 15 - South Sudan accuses neighboring Sudan of "stealing" its oil exports.
- January 20 - The United Nations says 120,000 people in South Sudan required aid amid tribal fighting.

=== February ===
- February 2 - The People's Republic of China asks for assistance from South Sudan to obtain the release of 29 Chinese workers held captive in Sudan for five days.
- February 11 - Sudan and South Sudan sign a non-aggression treaty.
- February 14 - A Sudanese air strike hits the South Sudanese state of Unity, injuring four soldiers in a contested area.

=== September ===
The presidents of both Sudan and South Sudan meet in Ethiopia, and after days of discussion, agree on trade, oil and security deals.
