= 2015 in South Sudan =

- Decades: 2000s; 2010s; 2020s
- See also: Other events of 2015; Timeline of South Sudanese history

The following lists events that happened during 2015 in the Sudan.

== Incumbents ==
- President: Salva Kiir
- Vice President: James Wani Igga

== Events ==
=== June ===
- June 23 - A cholera outbreak is declared after 171 people are infected while 18 people die from it.

=== July ===
- July 3 - 29 people are revealed to have died from a cholera outbreak.
- July 9 - The first coins of the South Sudanese pound were released into circulation. They are 10, 20, and 50 Piasters
