= Ntumba Luaba =

Democratic Republic of the Congo politician

Professor Ntumba Luaba

2nd Executive Secretary of ICGLR
- In office 15 December 2011 – 2016
- Preceded by: Liberata Mulamula
- Succeeded by: Zachary Muburi-Muita

Deputy Executive Secretary of CEPGL
- In office June 2009 – December 2011

Personal details
- Born: Katanga Province, DRC
- Children: 6
- Education: University of Kinshasa; Nancy-Université

Alphonse Daniel Ntumba Luaba Lumu was the Executive Secretary of International Conference on the Great Lakes Region from December 2011 until 2016.

He previously served as the Human Rights Minister of the Democratic Republic of the Congo (DR of the Congo). Prior to this appointment, he was a professor of Public International Law in Kinshasa. He was one of the persons, who represented the DR of the Congo at the International Court of Justice at the Hague.

In May 2003, Ntumba was forced to seek refuge at UN controlled facilities during a local bloodbath that killed more than 112 people. This incident was one of several in recent years in which Ntumba's personal safety was threatened by continued internal violence. A year earlier, in 2002, Ntumba was held hostage for a week by Hema militants in Bunia before being released unharmed. Ntumba Luaba held several positions in DRC's government such as MP, deputy minister of justice, minister of human rights, secretary general of government. He was the Director of the national DDR program until his appointment as DRC's representative and executive secretary of the CEPGL (Great Lakes Economic Community).
