= 2014 in South Sudan =

- Decades: 2000s; 2010s; 2020s
- See also: Other events of 2014; Timeline of South Sudanese history

The following lists events that happened during 2014 in South Sudan.

== Incumbents ==
- President: Salva Kiir
- Vice President: James Wani Igga

== Events ==
=== January ===
- January 3 - The United States evacuates additional diplomatic personnel at its embassy in Juba due to the deteriorating security situation.

=== April ===
- April 17 - Dozens of civilians sheltering in a UN base in Bor are killed in an attack by armed men.
- April 21 - The UN condemns the "Targeted Killings" and wounding of hundreds of civilians based on their ethnic origins in the town of Bentiu after South Sudanese rebels seized the oil hub last week.

=== November ===
- November 4 - The United States circulates a draft resolution proposing a sanctions regime for conflict-torn South Sudan.

=== December ===
- December 8 - The United Nations seeks $16.4 billion to fund humanitarian assistance programs in 2015 with Syria, Iraq, Sudan and South Sudan the areas of greatest need.
