= 2025 Fangak bombing =

Bombing in South Sudan

2025 Fangak Bombing
- Part of Aftermath of the South Sudanese civil war and Ethnic violence in South Sudan
- Date: May 3, 2025
- Time: 4:30 - 7:30 a.m. (GMT+2)
- Location: Fangak, Jonglei State, South Sudan
- Cause: Bombing
- Perpetrator: South Sudan People's Defence Forces
- Deaths: 7
- Injuries: 27+

On May 3, 2025, a bombing targeted a Médecins Sans Frontières (MSF) hospital and pharmacy in Fangak, Jonglei State, South Sudan, resulting in at least seven deaths and more than twenty-seven injured.

== Background ==
On 2 May 2025, the SSPDF ordered retaliatory military action if hijacked vessels at Adok Port in Leer County were not immediately released by the hijackers. The attack is the second time an MSF hospital in South Sudan has been impacted in the past month, following the armed looting of a hospital and premises in Ulang County on April 14 2025, which led to the entire population of the county being cut off from accessing secondary health care.

== Attack ==
The attack began at around 4:30 a.m. (GMT+2) when two helicopter gunships first dropped a bomb on the MSF pharmacy, burning it to the ground, then went on to fire on the town of Old Fangak for around 30 minutes. At around 7 a.m. (GMT+2), a drone bombed the Old Fangak market. At least seven people were killed, while 27 others were injured. Fangak County Commissioner, Biel Butros Biel, told The Associated Press that a 9-month-old child was among the dead in the aerial attack.

The attack destroyed the pharmacy and severely damaged the hospital, which served approximately 110,000 residents, including many displaced by severe flooding, and armed conflict.

== International Reactions ==
United Nations

- UNMISS – "The United Nations Mission in South Sudan (UNMISS) condemns continuing air strikes in Fangak, Jonglei state, which have led to civilian deaths, injuries and displacement as well as the destruction of humanitarian property."
- (United Nations) OHCHR – "The UN Commission on Human Rights in South Sudan condemns in the strongest terms the deliberate aerial bombing of a Médecins Sans Frontières (MSF) hospital in Old Fangak, Jonglei State - an atrocity crime that may constitute a grave breach of international humanitarian law and a war crime."

European Union – The European Union on May 5, 2025 condemned the bombing of a hospital run by medical charity Médecins Sans Frontières (MSF)

- France – France condemned the helicopter and drone attack on the Doctors Without Borders hospital in Old Fangak, South Sudan.
- Netherlands – The Netherlands condemned the bombing of the MSF hospital and other civilian sites in Jonglei State’s Fangak County.
- Germany – Germany condemned the bombing of the MSF hospital and other civilian sites in Jonglei State’s Fangak County.

African Union – "The Chairperson of the African Union Commission, Mahmoud Ali Youssouf, has learned with shock and dismay the recent bombing of the Médecins sans frontières (MSF) health facility in Old Fangak town, Fangak County in Jonglei State, South Sudan on Saturday, 3 May 2025."

Norway – Norway condemned the bombing of the MSF hospital and other civilian sites in Jonglei State’s Fangak County.

Canada – Canada condemned the bombing of the MSF hospital and other civilian sites in Jonglei State’s Fangak County.

United Kingdom – The United Kingdom condemned the bombing of the MSF hospital and other civilian sites in Jonglei State’s Fangak County.

United States – Condemned the bombing of MSF hospital in Old Fangak, South Sudan.

Médecins Sans Frontières – “We strongly condemn this attack, which took place despite the geolocations of all MSF structures, including Old Fangak Hospital, being shared with all parties to the conflict,” said Mamman Mustapha, MSF head of mission in South Sudan.

World Council of Churches – The World Council of Churches (WCC) expresses profound sorrow and concern over the tragic aerial attack on the Doctors Without Borders (Médecins Sans Frontières, MSF) hospital in Old Fangak, South Sudan, on 3 May 2025. This heinous act, which claimed the lives of at least seven people—including a 9-month-old child—and injured more than twenty others, is a heartbreaking violation of international humanitarian law and a direct assault on the dignity of human life.
