= 2017 in South Sudan =

- Decades: 2000s; 2010s; 2020s
- See also: Other events of 2017; Timeline of South Sudanese history

The following lists events in the year 2017 in South Sudan.

== Incumbents ==
- President: Salva Kiir
- Vice President: James Wani Igga

== Events ==
=== February ===
- 20 February – The South Sudan government and the United Nations declared a famine in parts of Unity State, affecting more than 100,000 people, and fearing the famine could spread significantly as the order of one million people are threatened.

== Deaths ==
- 4 January – Gabriel Tang, rebel militia leader, killed in Civil War.
