= Abiemnom County =

Abiemnom West County and Abiemnom East County Greater Abiemnom Biemnom
- Counties
- Motto: Pan poiun Tok
- Location in South Sudan
- Coordinates: 9.398385°N 28.82334°E
- Country: South Sudan
- State: Ruweng Administrative Area
- Established: 2000

Government
  - Type: local government
  - County Commissioner: Mario Deng Ayot Abiemnom East County
  - County Commissioner: Bolis Mabeik Mijok Abiemnom West County

Population (2024)
  - Total: 73,471
- Time zone: UTC+2 (CAT)

Abiemnom (or Biemnom) is an administrative area in the extreme northwest of Ruweng Administrative Area, South Sudan. It borders Southern Kordofan in Sudan to the north.

The main ethnic group are the Ruweng Dinka. In 2016 Abiemnom and Panreing they separated from Unity State and became Ruweng Administrative Area. The headquarter of Abiemnom East is Aniep Neip and the headquarter of Abiemnom West is Awarpiny. The county is divided into two Counties Abiemnom West and Abiemnom East and seven Payams:Manajoga, Pathiew, Panyang, Bang Bang, Abiemnom, Magok and Awarpiny. The Malwal River and Kiir River both cross Abiemnom on their way to the Nile. Although the county lies outside the Sudd, it is affected by swamps. As of 2009, the only health care in the county was provided by four nurses.

After the April 2010 elections, forces led by General Galwak Gai, said to be composed of defecting SPLA/SSPA elements, staged attacks against SPLA garrisons and checkpoints in Abiemnom, Mayom, and Rubkona counties. As of June 2010 the county was affected by militia attacks and also by Messeryia migrations and attacks. In May 2010 there were 3,153 Internally Displaced People in Abiemnom town.

On March 1, 2026 at least 169 people were killed in an attack by armed youths linked to rebel faction on Abiemnom.
