= André Mbata =

Congolese politician and law professor

First Vice President of the National Assembly of the Democratic Republic of the Congo
- Incumbent
- Assumed office 27 April 2022
- President: Félix Tshisekedi
- Prime Minister: Sama Lukonde
- Preceded by: Jean-Marc Kabund

Chairman of the Political, Administrative and Legal Commission
- Incumbent
- Assumed office 20 May 2021
- Nominated by: Christophe Mboso N'Kodia Pwanga
- Preceded by: Lucain Kasongo

National Deputy
- Incumbent
- Assumed office 28 January 2019
- Constituency: Dimbelenge Territory

Personal details
- Born: 13 December 1960 (age 65) Bena Mbangal, Congo-Léopoldville (now Democratic Republic of the Congo)
- Party: UDPS
- Occupation: Politician, law professor

André Mbata Betu Kumesu Mangu (born 13 December 1960) is a Congolese politician and law professor who has served as the First Vice President of the National Assembly since 2022.

== Early life ==
Mbata was born on 13 December 1960 in the village of Bena Mbangal in the Dimbelenge Territory of Kasaï-Central in Congo-Léopoldville, which had only gained its independence from Belgium a few months prior.

== Political career ==
Mbata was elected as a national deputy for the Dimbelenge Territory in the 2018 Congolese general election, the first such election to take place in seven years, and sworn in on 28 January 2019. He was nominated to the position of Chairman of the Political, Administrative and Legal Commission (Note: French: Commission Politique Administrative et Juridique; PAJ) by National Assembly President Christophe Mboso N'Kodia Pwanga on 20 May 2021, replacing Lucain Kasongo.

On 27 April 2022, he was elected by the National Assembly to replace Jean-Marc Kabund as First Vice President of the National Assembly, with Mboso continuing as president.

He was subsequently re-elected as both a National Deputy and First Vice-president of the National Assembly in the 2023 elections.

== Law career ==
Mbata is a professor of constitutional law at both the University of Kinshasa and the University of South Africa. He is also a member of the Council for the Development of Social Science Research in Africa (CODESRIA) and the African Constitutional Law Network (RADCL). He is the author of several books, such as On the abolition of the death penalty and constitutionalism in Africa and Nationalism, Pan-Africanism and African Reconstruction.
