= Fangak =

- Location in South Sudan
- Coordinates: 9.066156°N 30.88112°E
- Country: South Sudan
- Region: Greater Upper Nile
- State: Jonglei State
- County: Fangak County

Fangak is a community in the Fangak County of Jonglei State, in the Greater Upper Nile region of South Sudan. The capital is Old Fangak. It was once a British garrison town. The administration buildings were destroyed during the civil war.

During the Second Sudanese Civil War, Gabriel Tanginye, commander of a pro-government Nuer militia had his base in Fangak. Tanginya was at first associated with Commander Paulino Matiep in Anyanya II, then with Paulino joined Riek Machar's SPLA-Nasir force in 1991. In the 1990s the SPLA-Nasir militia was said to have had its only prison at Fangak, which lies in the center of a malarial swamp.

In February 2011, forces loyal to the rebel General George Athor attacked three operational outposts of the Sudan People's Liberation Army (SPLA). They briefly occupied the town of Fangak before withdrawing when SPLA troops arrived. Several people died in the conflict. Later the SPLA reported that at least 105 people had been killed, mostly women and children. UN Secretary-General Ban Ki-moon called for immediate implementation of the January ceasefire agreement.

Starting in July 2020, unusually heavy rains have flood the White Nile, destroying crops, farms and villages in Jonglei and other states in the area. Of 62 villages in Old Fangak, 45 were devastated by floods. About 1.6 million people required assistance according to the United Nations.

Fangak, being remote and isolated, and the capital Old Fangak on an island and accessible only by boat or small plane, has attracted many refugees from fighting in other parts of the country.

On May 3, 2025, a bombing targeted a Médecins Sans Frontières (MSF) hospital and pharmacy in Fangak, Jonglei State, South Sudan, resulting in at least seven deaths and over 27 injured.

== Notable people ==
- Buth Diu (died 1972)
