= Khortumbak =

Town in Upper Nile State, Sudan

Khortumbak or Khor Tumbak is a town in Upper Nile State, Sudan.

== History ==
On 6 August 2024, two people were killed after SAF warplanes crossed into South Sudanese airspace and bombed the town of Khortumbak.
