= Arkangelo Bari Wanji =

South Sudanese politician (1936–2016)

Arkangelo Barri Wanji (1936 – 14 March 2016) was a South Sudanese politician of the Sudan People's Liberation Movement. He was a member of the National Legislative Assembly since its inception in 2011. He was previously a member of the predecessor institute, the Southern Sudan Legislative Assembly, to which he was elected in the 2010 South Sudanese general election. He represented Western Bahr el Ghazal in parliament.

While campaigning for the 2011 South Sudanese independence referendum, Wanji urged voters to vote for independence, while remaining peaceful.

Wanji was a member of the Golo ethnic group, and originated from Wau County, Western Bahr el Ghazal. He died in Juba on 14 March 2016, aged 80.
