= David Manyok Barac Atem =

South Sudanese military leader (1959–2021)

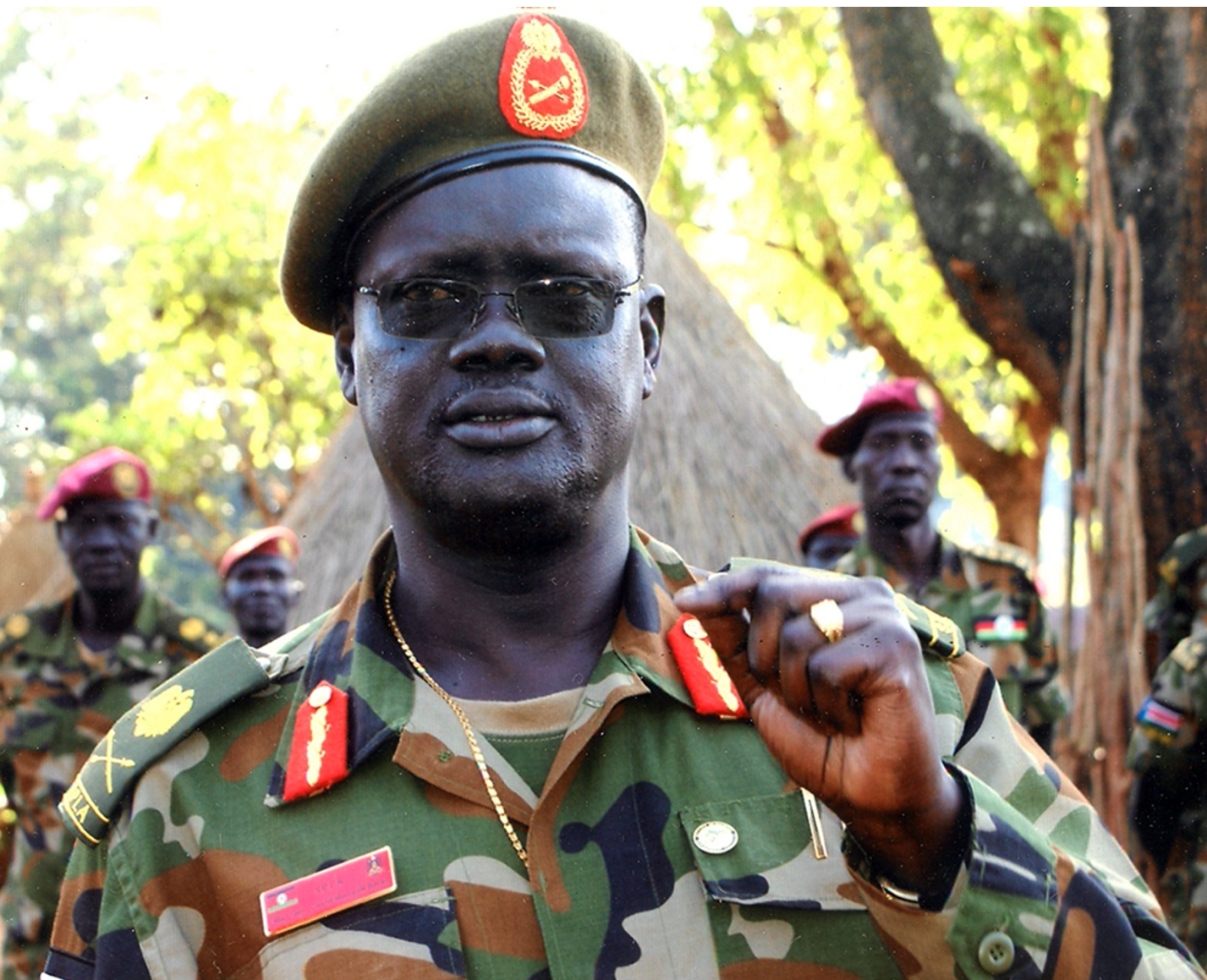
- Atem addressing soldiers
- Born: 1 January 1959
- Died: 26 February 2021 (aged 62); Juba, South Sudan
- Military career
- Allegiance: South Sudan
- Rank: Major General
- War: Second Sudanese Civil War

Major General David Manyok Barac Atem (1 January 1959 – 26 February 2021) was a South Sudanese military leader.

== Military ==
Atem fought in the Second Sudanese Civil War, which resulted in the establishment of South Sudan as an independent nation. David joined the Jamus Battalion on May 16, 1983, when fighting broke out in Bor. In January 2021, he was deployed to the SSPDF General headquarters in Bilpham by President Salva Kiir and as the Director of Administration, Personnel, and Finance by the Commander in Chief of the SSPDF Gen. Salva Kiir. He held the position for nearly a month, until his death in Juba on 26 February 2021 due to COVID-19.

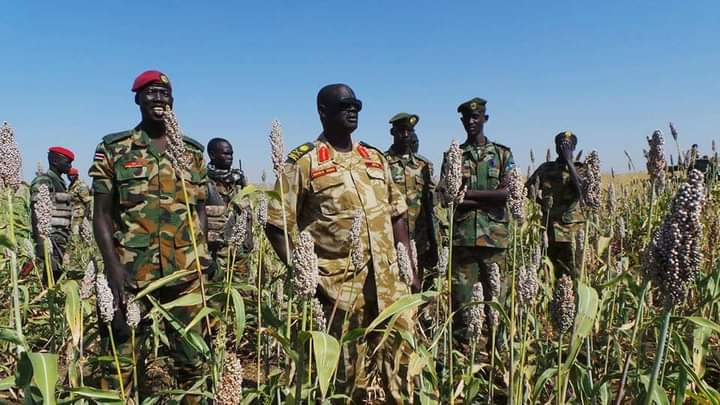
Atem standing in a military farm in Renk, South Sudan
