= Abiemnom massacre =

2026 massacre in South Sudan

- Abiemnom massacre (South Sudan)
- Location: 9.3983°N 28.8233°E; Abiemnom County, Ruweng Administrative Area
- Date: 1 March 2026; 05:00 – ~08:00 (CAT, UTC+02:00)
- Attack type: Massacre, mass murder, mass shooting
- Weapon: Guns
- Deaths: 213
- Injuries: 109
- Perpetrator: Local armed youth

The Abiemnom massacre took place in Abiemnom, South Sudan on March 1, 2026. According to local government authorities, the attack killed at least 213 people and injured at least 109. The death toll included 130 town residents, 76 security personnel and 7 foreign nationals. It was perpetrated by unidentified armed youth from the neighboring Unity State.

== Background ==
Abiemnom is part of the Ruweng Administrative Area (RAA), a region described as a "carved out mono-ethnic Dinka area" that has experienced recurring intercommunal violence. There had been raids conducted against the Dinka in Ruweng by Nuer youth from the neighboring Unity State, typically motivated by cattle raiding. On April 2, 2025, armed youth from nearby town of Mayom attacked and seized Abiemnom momentarily, killing at least 27 people and injuring 17 others.

== Attack ==
The massacre began around 5 am on March 1, 2026, when unidentified armed youths crossed the state border from Mayom county to Abiemnom. The attack lasted around three hours and ended when the youths dispersed and retreated to Mayom. Of the 169 killed, 79 were government soldiers and 90 were civilians. The executive director of Abiemnom County was also killed. During the attack over 1000 civilians sought refugee in the Abienmon UNMISS compound.

Stephano Wieu De Mialek, the chief administrator of RAA, alleged that the attackers were members of the Nuer White Army and supported by the SPLA-IO. SPLA-IO denied these claims stating that “Our forces stationed in Kubri Jamus remain in their designated positions and have not conducted any military operation targeting civilian populations." RAA community leaders and former RAA officials claimed that the armed youth were associated and armed by the SSPDF. According to the community leaders SSPDF had armed the youth with weapons seized from the retreating Sudanese Armed Forces (SAF) after the fall of Heglig across the border.

== Aftermath ==
Civil society groups urged the government to deploy security forces and call for a nationwide mourning. The United Nations Mission in South Sudan (UNMISS) and UNICEF strongly condemned the attack and expressed alarm over the surging violence in Abiemnom. Jackson Mut, a former commissioner of Mayom County alleged that Unity State Officials had prior knowledge of the impending attack. James Monyluak Mijok, information minister for the RAA alleged that the attackers were partly from the Bul Nuer armed youth group called "Terchuong".

In November 2026, Amnesty International published an investigation reporting that both South Sudanese authorities and UNMISS had received warnings of an imminent attack two weeks in advance, but had not taken sufficient preventative measures. UNMISS spokesperson Priyanka Chowdhury responded with a statement that UNMISS requested the deployment of additional security forces from the national army after receiving early warnings, but the request was not met. She also said that due to the limited resources, UNMISS was forced to prioritize the protection of civilians sheltering at its compound.
