= Relief International =

- Type: International development Charity, Nonprofit
- Purpose: health and nutrition, livelihoods, education, water, sanitation and hygiene, conflict, climate change, disaster relief
- Location(s): Washington, D.C. and London
- Chief Executive: Craig Redmond
- Website: https://www.ri.org/

Relief International is an international non-governmental organization (NGO) that partners with communities impacted by conflict, climate change, and disaster to save lives, build greater resilience, and promote long-term health and wellbeing. Relief International is a global alliance of four organizations: Relief International Inc, Relief International UK, Relief International France and Relief International Europe.
