= Panyume =

Place in South Sudan

- Payam
- Location within South Sudan
- Coordinates: 3°46′49″N 30°57′02″E
- County: South Sudan
- Region: Equatoria
- State: Central Equatoria
- County: Morobo County
- Payam: Panyume

Government
  - Type: Payam Administrator
- Time zone: UTC+3 (South Sudan Standard Time)

Panyume is a place located in Morobo County of Central Equatoria, South Sudan and also serves as the administrative area of Panyume payam.

Panyume has been affected with the South Sudanese Civil War which broke out in 2016 forcing many people to flee to refugees settlements in Uganda.

== Health services ==
Panyume has a number of health facilities that offer health services to the community across the Payam and beyond such as Panyume PHCC.

== Education ==
Panyume has a number of primary school which were close during the south Sudan conflict as opposition force where base in the Payam
