= Malualkon =

- Location in South Sudan
- Coordinates: 9°1′9″N 27°37′38″E
- Country: South Sudan
- State: Northern Bahr el Ghazal
- County: Aweil East County
- Time zone: UTC+2 (CAT)

Malualkon, or Malual Kon, is a small rural South Sudanese town. It lies in the Aweil East County of Northern Bahr el Ghazal, roughly 400 miles from Rumbek.

Malualkon is extremely hot most of the year, and experiences a rainy season roughly between April and October. Malualkon is the base for UN OCHA work in the region, although OCHA has not been very effective in the area in past years.

Malualkon was formerly one of the key airstrips for the area northeast of Aweil. The strip has not been maintained, however, and is still in use by Humanitarian actors.

After the Comprehensive Peace Agreement was signed, many people have begun to return from Khartoum or other places to Malualkon and other locations within Northern Bahr el Ghazal. These "returnees" are putting pressure on the already stretched water resources and limited government services in the area. Multiple non-governmental organizations are based in Malualkon and helping these returnees is part of their mission.
