= Chol Ajongo Mawut =

South Sudanese Politician

Chol Ajongo is a South Sudanese politician and former Minister of Presidential Affairs.in the Revitalized Transitional Government of National Unity. He was appointed to this position on August 19, 2024, succeeding his role as South Sudan's Ambassador to Kenya. Ajongo was replaced by Africano Mande Gedima on November 3, 2025.
