= Nairobi Declaration =

South Sudanese peace process

- Leader: Dickson Gatluak Jock
- Dates active: 28 January 2023
- Active regions: South Sudan
- Ideology: anti-government
- Status: Ongoing
- Wars: South Sudanese Civil War

The Nairobi Declaration (Arabic: إعــــــــــلان نيـــــــروبي) is an ongoing attempt by a group of South Sudanese military officials led by rebel deputy chief of staff Dickson Gatluak Jock to remove Paul Malong Awan as leader of the opposition South Sudan United Front/Army (SSUF/A). The officers according to the declaration accused Malong of being "incompetent" to lead and has not been able to meet his troops on the ground.

== Background ==
From the formation of SSUF/A back in 2018 following his 2017 fallout with President Salva Kiir to his attempted ouster on January 28, 2023, Malong has entirely based in Nairobi, unable to see his troops on the ground. This angered most of his allies who either switched side to join Kiir’s government or join the National Salvation Front (NAS) led by Thomas Cirilo.

Since then, several military and political officials of the group have either split to form factions of their own or join the government of President Salva Kiir. Recent defections include that of the SSUF/A spokesman Chol Duang, who retired from politics and returned to Juba, and Sunday De John who broke away to form a faction of his own.

== The Declaration ==
At 5:00PM on Saturday, 28 January 2023, Dickson and a group of senior military and political officers including the deputy chairman of SSUF announced Malong's ouster, and accused him of "running the movement single-handedly" and stated that international sanctions imposed on him have gravely affected the movement.

Malong responded in a statement and expelled the officers, accusing them of having been caught red-handed engaging with South Sudan unity government in Juba.

== Aftermath ==
The declaration by the group led to the defection of a group of military officers abandoning Malong and joining Dickson Gatluak and his officers.
