= Malwal River =

River in South Sudan

Coordinates: 9.348464°N 29.028454°E

The Malwal River (or Khor Malwal, Malual) is a river in South Sudan. It flows through Unity State, coming from Warrap and crossing Abiemnom, Mayom County and Rubkona on its way to the Bahr el Arab (Kiir River).
