= Zachary Muburi-Muita =

Vice-President of the Assembly of States Parties of the International Criminal Court
- In office 2008–2010
- Appointed by: Assembly of States Parties
- Succeeded by: Simona Miculescu

Personal details
- Born: 1957 (age 68–69)

Zachary Muburi-Muita (born in 1957) is a Kenyan politician who from 2010 until June 2013 served as the Head of the United Nations Office to the African Union. He was then replaced by Haile Menkerios.

== Career ==
Muburi-Muita became involved with the Kenyan Government in 1982, where his positions included serving as High Commissioner to the United Republic of Tanzania and standing as main Counsellor at the Kenya Embassy in Israel. In 2006, he became Kenya's Permanent Representative to the United Nations in New York City. Concurrently, he served as the Vice-President of the Bureau of the Assembly of States Parties to the Rome Statute of the International Criminal Court. In January 2010 he was elected President of the United Nations High-Level Committee on South-South Cooperation a central body in the governance structure of South-South Cooperation within the UN System that manages the intergovernmental review and policymaking of South-South Cooperation.
