= Awow Daniel Chuang =

Politician in South Sudan

Caretaker Minister of Petroleum
- Incumbent
- Assumed office Sep 2026

Personal details
- Born: 1974 (age 51–52) Upper Nile Region of South Sudan
- Party: Sudan People's Liberation Movement {SPLM}
- Occupation: Politician and Engineer

Awow Daniel Chuang (also spelled Awou Daniel Chuang) is a South Sudanese engineer and politician who currently serves as a caretaker mMinister of Petroleum as of September 2026. He is a member of Sudan People's Liberation Movement (SPLM) and has held senior positions in South Sudan's petroleum and financial sectors.

== Career ==
Chuang served as senior technical advisor to the Ministry of Petroleum prior to his appointment to other ministerial positions. During this period, he was involved in the petroleum sector reforms and policy initiatives.

As undersecretary of the Ministry of Petroleum, Chuang was credited with implementing significant reforms. He structured and implemented the Ministry's unified Human Resource Manual, which harmonized employment guidelines and enhanced salary structures within oil companies. He promoted institutional accountability and transparency initiatives.

=== Minister of Finance ===
On March 18, 2024, Chuang took oath as a national Minister of Finance and Planning following his appointment by president Salva Kiir Mayardit. He replaced Dr. Bak Barnaba Chol. Chuang was tasked with implementing fiscal stabilization measures to address the country's economic challenges, including hyperinflation and currency devaluation. In his remarks after the swearing-in ceremony, President Kiir expressed confidence in Chuang's long track record of experience and dedication to public service and he urged him to implement policies to lift the economic burden on the people.

=== Caretaker Minister of Petroleum ===
In September 2026, following president Salva Kiir Mayardit's dissolution of the entire government of the Republic of South Sudan, Chuang was appointed as a caretaker national minister of petroleum. The caretaker administration was established to serve until the conduct of the forthcoming general elections scheduled for December 2026.
