= Leer County =

Leer county
- County
- Location in South Sudan
- Coordinates: 8.297855°N 30.147525°E
- Country: South Sudan
- Region: Greater Upper Nile
- State: Unity State

Area
  - Total: 631 sq mi (1,633 km^{2})

Population (2017 estimate)
  - Total: 79,653
  - Density: 126.3/sq mi (48.78/km^{2})
- Time zone: UTC+2 (CAT)

Leer County is an administrative division of Unity State in the Greater Upper Nile region of South Sudan. The headquarters is in the town of Leer.

In December 2009, traffic police established roadblocks along the road between Panyijar County and Leer and demanded high bribes from travelers who wanted to pass. In March 2011 the Governor of Unity State, Taban Deng Gai, launched a drive to recruit men for the army. In April, Leer County police were reportedly enrolling young men into the Sudan People's Liberation Army by force, apparently on orders from the County Commissioner, who was in turn obeying the Governor's orders. On 12 May 2011, landmines on the road from Leer to Bentiu exploded, destroying two vehicles, killing three people, and seriously injuring others. The border of Sudan to the north was blocked, causing shortages of supplies, and there were rumors that militias were moving south through the county.
