= COVID-19 pandemic in South Sudan =

Ongoing COVID-19 viral pandemic in South Sudan

- Disease: COVID-19
- Pathogen: SARS-CoV-2
- Location: South Sudan
- Arrival date: 5 April 2020 (6 years, 6 months, 3 weeks and 2 days)
- Confirmed cases: 18,873 (updated 18 September 2026)
- Deaths: 147 (updated 18 September 2026)

The COVID-19 pandemic in South Sudan was part of the worldwide pandemic of coronavirus disease 2019 (COVID-19) caused by severe acute respiratory syndrome coronavirus 2 (SARS-CoV-2). The virus was confirmed to have reached South Sudan on 5 April 2020. The first four confirmed cases were all UN workers.

== Timeline ==
=== Prevention efforts ===
On 14 March, South Sudan suspended flights to countries affected by coronavirus. On 20 March, classes in all schools and universities were suspended until 19 April, and Vice President Hussein Abdelbagi ordered the suspension of sporting, social, political, and religious gatherings for 6 weeks. This was followed on 25 March by a nighttime curfew from 8 p.m. to 6 a.m. On 27 March, around 500 people in quarantine from Sudan escaped in Renk, leading to northern Upper Nile State being placed under lockdown for 14 days. From 25 March, after the coronavirus reached Mali, to 5 April 2020, South Sudan was the largest country by area without any confirmed cases of COVID-19.

South Sudan has a population of approximately 12 million people but only 4 ventilators.

=== April to June 2020 ===
- On 5 April, the first case of COVID-19 in the country was confirmed in a 29-year-old patient, a United Nations worker who arrived on 28 February from the Netherlands via Ethiopia. South Sudan thus became the 51st African country (out of 54) to confirm a case. The patient was quarantined at a UN facility and contact tracing efforts were undertaken.
- The second case of COVID-19 was confirmed on 7 April; the patient was another female United Nations worker, aged 53, who arrived from Nairobi on 23 March and self-quarantined. The third case on 9 April was also a female United Nations worker who had been in contact with the first patient.
- On 9 April, the Ministry of General Education announced it was preparing a distance learning program for primary and secondary school students via radio and television. On 13 April, South Sudan suspended flights and public transportation between the states and between Juba and the states.
- Unlike the first cases, the fifth and sixth cases on 23 and 25 April were confirmed to be South Sudanese nationals.
- After 28 people tested positive on 28 April, the curfew was extended to be from 7 p.m. to 6 a.m., all restaurants were only allowed to be takeout, and all passenger boda bodas were banned.
- A total of 35 patients tested positive in April. All 35 were active cases at the end of the month.
- Although cases were still increasing, South Sudan began the process of reopening on 7 May. The curfew was decreased to 10 p.m. to 6 a.m., boda bodas were allowed to have one passenger and rickshaws two passengers, if both the driver and the passengers wore face masks, and shops were allowed to reopen with a maximum of five occupants at a time. On 12 May, airports were reopened for local, regional, and international flights.
- On 14 May, South Sudan reported its first death from COVID-19.
- On 18 May, First Vice President Riek Machar announced he and his wife, Angelina Teny, had tested positive for the virus. On 19 May 2020, Information Minister Michael Makuei Lueth and all members of the nation's 15-member coronavirus task force tested positive for COVID-19. Another Vice President, Hussein Abdelbagi, the head of the COVID-19 Task Force, tested positive on May 27. Vice President James Wani Igga announced he had tested positive on May 30.
- There were 959 new cases in May, raising the total number of confirmed cases to 994. Ten persons died in May while six patients recovered, leaving 978 active cases at the end of the month.
- In June there were 1013 new cases, bringing the total number of confirmed cases to 2007. The death toll rose by 28 to 38. The number of recovered patients increased to 279, leaving 1690 active cases at the end of the month.

=== July to December 2020 ===
- Towards the middle of July, business owners in Aweil reported that the pandemic had caused food prices to rise and that the number of customers in restaurants had decreased. On July 24, officials in Eastern Equatoria State reported an increase in the number of teenage pregnancies during the lockdown, which could lead to more school dropouts.
- The government reopened schools in September after six months of closure.
- There were 345 new cases in July, 167 in August, 185 in September, 222 in October, 183 in November, and 449 in December. The total number of cases stood at 2352 in July, 2519 in August, 2704 in September, 2926 in October, 3109 in November, and 3558 in December.
- The number of recovered patients stood at 1205 in July, 1438 in September, and 3131 in December, leaving 1101 active cases at the end of July, 1190 at the end of August, 1217 at the end of September, 1557 at the end of October, 94 at the end of November, and 364 at the end of December.
- The death toll rose to 46 in July, 47 in August, 49 in September, 59 in October, 61 in November, and 63 in December.

=== January to December 2021 ===
- Vaccination started on 6 April, initially with 132,000 doses of AstraZeneca's Covishield vaccine provided through the COVAX pillar. After a slow roll-out, South Sudan decided to return 72,000 doses to COVAX and aim to administer the remaining 60,000 doses before their expiry date.
- Health ministry officials announced on 19 April that 60,000 doses of AstraZeneca's vaccine donated by the African Union and MTN Group would be destroyed because of their short expiry date.
- There were 11,684 confirmed cases in 2021, bringing the total number of cases to 15,242. 9,803 patients recovered in 2021 while 72 persons died, bringing the total death toll to 135. At the end of 2021 there were 2,173 active cases.
- Modeling carried out by the WHO’s Regional Office for Africa suggests that due to under-reporting, the true cumulative number of infections by the end of 2021 was around 4.9 million while the true number of COVID-19 deaths was around 1750.

=== January to December 2022 ===
- There were 3,151 confirmed cases in 2022, bringing the total number of cases to 18,393. 5,181 patients recovered in 2022 while 3 persons died, bringing the total death toll to 138. At the end of 2022 there were 140 active cases.

=== January to December 2023 ===
- There were 426 confirmed cases in 2023, bringing the total number of cases to 18,819. Nine persons died, bringing the total death toll to 147. At the end of 2023 there were 503 active cases.

== Data ==
Cumulative number of confirmed cases, recoveries and deaths

Confirmed new cases per day

View source data.

Confirmed deaths per day

View source data.

Number of tests per day

View source data.

Number of confirmed cases by age

View source data.

Number of cases by sex

View source data.

== See also ==
- COVID-19 pandemic in Africa
- COVID-19 pandemic by country and territory
