= International Conference on the Great Lakes Region =

African intergovernmental organization

International Conference on the Great Lakes Region Jumuiya ya Nchi za Ukanda wa Maziwa Makuu (Swahili) Conférence Internationale sur la Région des Grands Lacs (French)
- Flag Logo

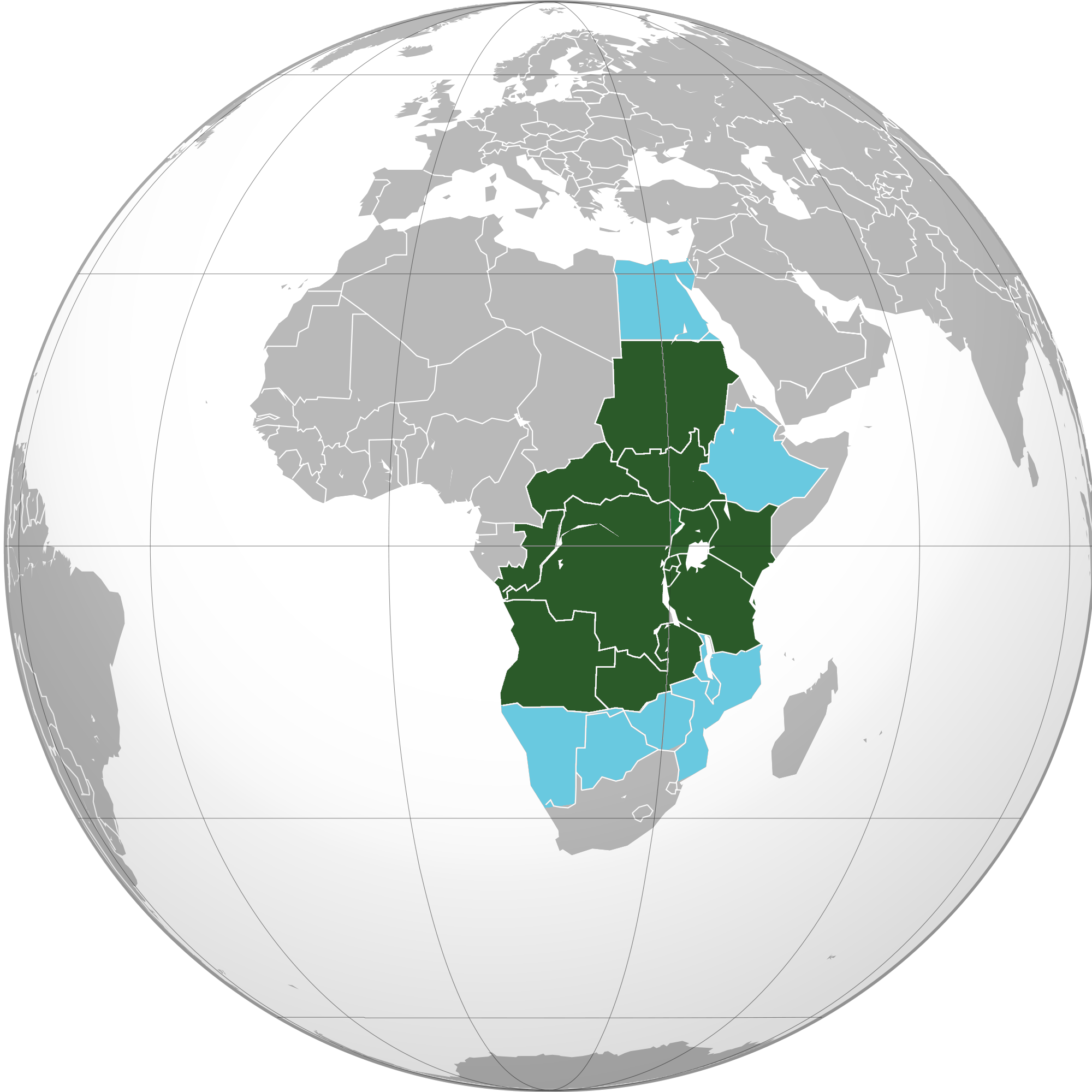
- Member states Co-opted members
- Headquarters: Bujumbura, Burundi
- Type: Intergovernmental organization
- Members: 12 member states 7 Co-opted members

Leaders
  - Chairperson: (Democratic Republic of the Congo) Félix Antoine Tshisekedi Tshilombo
  - Executive Secretary: (Zambia) Mubita Luwabelwa
- Establishment: 2008
  - Pact on Security, Stability and Development in the Great Lakes Region: 2006
- Website icglr.org

International Conference on the Great Lakes Region (ICGLR), French: Conférence Internationale sur la Région des Grands Lacs (CIRGL), is an intergovernmental organization of African countries in the African Great Lakes region.

== Membership ==
The organisation consists of the following members:

- Angola
- Burundi
- Central African Republic
- Republic of the Congo
- Democratic Republic of the Congo
- Kenya
- Rwanda
- Sudan
- South Sudan
- Tanzania
- Uganda
- Zambia

=== Co-opted members ===
- Botswana
- Egypt
- Ethiopia
- Malawi
- Mozambique
- Namibia
- Zimbabwe

== Leaders ==
=== Chairperson ===
Country	Name	Term
Tanzania	Benjamin William Mkapa	2004-2005
Tanzania	Jakaya Mrisho Kikwete	2005–2006
Kenya	Mwai Kibaki	2006-2009
Angola	Rupiah Bwezani Banda	2010-2011
Zambia	Michael Chilufya Sata	2011
Uganda	Yoweri Kaguta Museveni	2011-2013
Angola	Jose Eduardo dos Santos	2013-2017
Congo	Denis Sassou Nguesso	2017-2022
Angola	João Manuel Gonçalves Lourenço	2020-2025
Democratic Republic of Congo	Félix Antoine Tshisekedi Tshilombo	2025-present

=== Executive Secretaries ===
Country	Name	Term
Tanzania	Liberata Mulamula	2006-2011
Democratic Republic of the Congo	Ntumba Luaba	2011-2016
Kenya	Zachary Muburi-Muita	2016-2020
Angola	João Caholo	2020-2025
Zambia	Mubita Luwabelwa	2025-present

== See also ==
- East African Community
