= History of South Sudan =

Map of South Sudan

The history of South Sudan comprises the history of the territory of present-day South Sudan and the peoples inhabiting the region.

South Sudan's modern history is closely tied to that of Sudan. These ties began in the 19th century with the southward expansion of the Ottoman Khedivate of Egypt and the establishment of Turco-Egyptian Sudan with the land that makes up modern South Sudan remaining part of Sudan through the Mahdist State, Anglo-Egyptian Sudan and the Republic of Sudan up until South Sudan's independence in 2011.

South Sudan is mostly inhabited by Nilo-Saharan speaking peoples, with Niger-Congo speaking minorities in the western regions. Historically, what is now South Sudan was dominated by Central Sudanic and Koman speaking peoples. Proto-Nilotic speaking peoples migrating southwards started arriving in the northernmost regions of South Sudan (Upper Nile state) in 3,000 BC. Since about the 14th century, following the collapse of the Christian Nubian kingdoms of Makuria and Alodia, the Nilotic peoples gradually came to dominate the region.

== Early history ==
=== Roman Expedition ===
For many years the Sudd Marsh, and especially its thicket of vegetation, proved an impenetrable barrier to navigation along the Nile. In 61 AD, a party of Roman soldiers sent by Emperor Nero proceeded up the White Nile but were not able to get beyond the Sudd, which marked the limit of Roman penetration into equatorial Africa. For the same reasons in later times the search for the source of the Nile was particularly difficult; it eventually involved overland expeditions from the central African coast, so as to avoid having to travel through the Sudd.

=== Nilotic expansion out of the Sudd ===
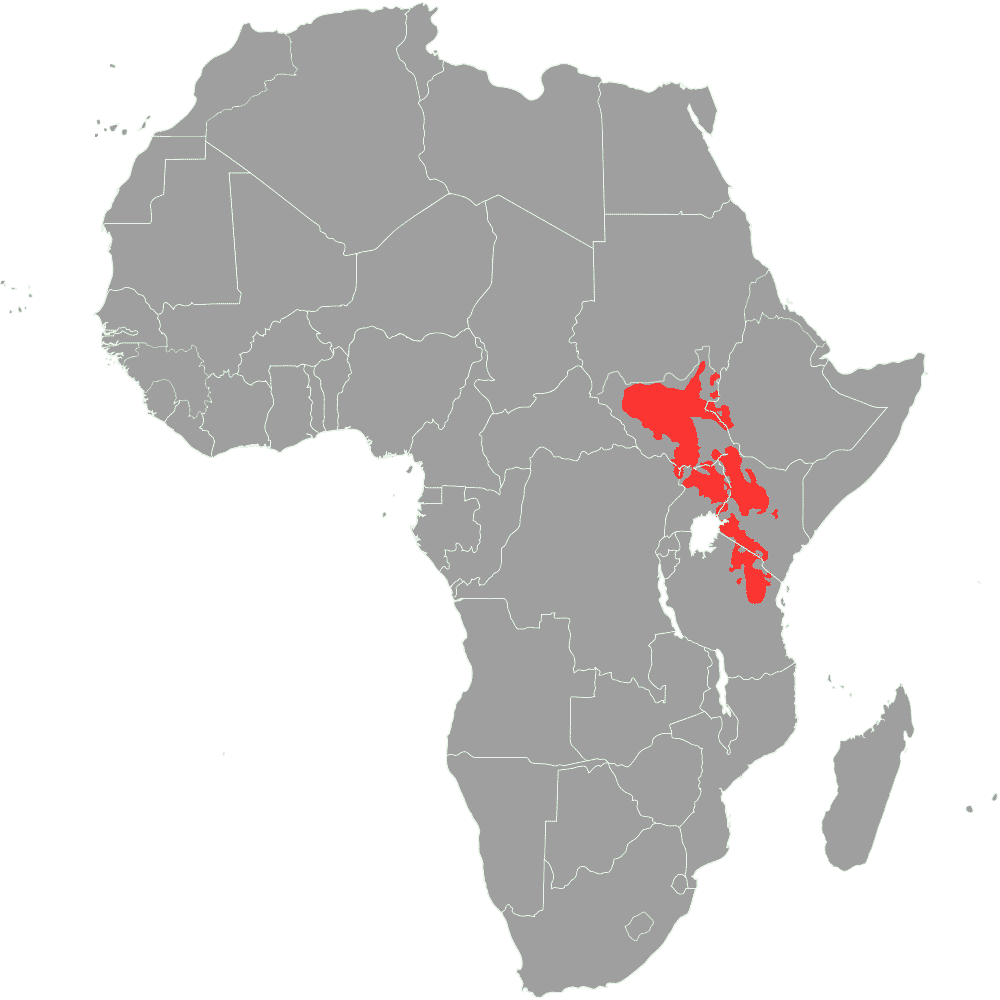
Areas where Nilotic languages are spoken

Linguistic evidence shows that over time Nilotic speakers, such as the Dinka/Jieng, Nuer/Naath, Shilluk, and Luo, took over. These groups spread from the Sudd marshlands, where archaeological evidence shows that a culture based on transhumant cattle raising had been present since 3000 BC, and the Nilotic culture in that area may thus be continuous to that date. Archaeological evidence, as well as the physical evidence in the livelihood of the Nilotes including their dome-shaped houses and tukuls, shows that they may have made an enormous contribution to the governance and wealth of the Nubia Kingdom before and during the 25th Dynasty.

The Nilotic expansion from the Sudd Marshes into the rest of South Sudan seems to have begun in the 14th century. This coincides with the collapse of the Christian Nubian kingdoms of Makuria and Alodia and the penetration of Arab traders into central Sudan. From the Arabs, the South Sudanese may have obtained new breeds of humpless cattle. Archaeologist Roland Oliver notes that the period also shows an Iron Age beginning among the Nilotics. These factors may explain how the Nilotic speakers expanded to dominate the region.

=== Central Sudanic Presence ===
Until about 1500 vast parts of South Sudan were controlled by speakers of Central Sudanic languages. A few Central Sudanic groups remain such as the Madi and the Moru.

=== Shilluk ===
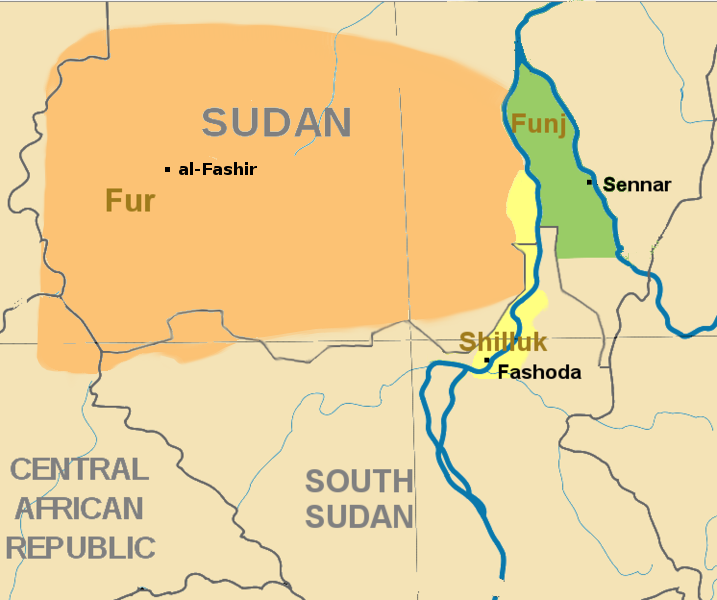
The kingdoms of the Funj, Shilluk, Tegali, and Fur c. 1800

By the sixteenth century, the most powerful group among the Nilotic speakers were the Shilluk, who spread east to the banks of the White Nile under the leadership of the semi-legendary Nyikang, who is said to have ruled the Shilluk c.1490 to c.1517. The Shilluk gained control of the west bank of the river as far north as Kosti in modern Sudan. There they established an economy based on cereal farming and fishing, with permanent settlements located along the length of the river. The Shilluk developed an intensive system of agriculture, and the Shilluk lands in the 17th century had a population density similar to that of the land around the Nile in Egypt.

It is theorized that it was pressure from the Shilluk that drove the Funj people north where they would establish the Funj Sultanate. The Dinka remained in the Sudd area, maintaining their transhumance economy.

While the Dinka were protected and isolated from their neighbors, the Shilluk were more involved in international affairs. The Shilluk controlled the west bank of the White Nile whilst the other side was controlled by the Funj Sultanate with regular conflict between the two. The Shilluk had the ability to quickly raid outside areas by war canoe and had control of the waters of the Nile. The Funj had a standing army of armored cavalry, and this force allowed them to dominated the plains of the Sahel.

Shilluk traditions tell of King Odak Ocollo who ruled c. 1630 and led them in a three-decade war with the Funj over control of the White Nile trade routes. The Shilluk allied with the Sultanate of Darfur and the Kingdom of Taqali against the Funj. The capitulation of Taqali ended the war in the Funj's favor. In the later 17th century the Shilluk and Funj allied against the Jieng, a group of Dinka who rose to power in the border area between the Funj and Shilluk. The Shilluk political structure gradually centralized under a king or reth. The most important is Reth Tugo who ruled c. 1690 to 1710 and established the Shilluk capital of Fashoda. The same period saw the gradual collapse of the Funj Sultanate, leaving the Shilluk in complete control of the White Nile and its trade routes. The Shilluk military power was based on control of the river.

=== Azande ===
The non-Nilotic Azande people, who entered southern Sudan in the 16th century, established the region's largest state. The Azande are the third largest nationality in southern Sudan. They are found in Maridi, Iba, Yambio, Nzara, Ezon, Tambura and Nagere Counties in the tropical rain forest belt of western Equatoria and Bahr el Ghazal. In the 18th century, the Avongara people entered and quickly imposed their authority over the Azande. Avongara power remained largely unchallenged until the arrival of the British at the end of the 19th century.

The Azande developed kingdoms dominated by families of Avongara aristocrats that enacted assimilationist policies that were built on the strength of converting conquered peoples into subjects of the king and noble class. This was done through a system of conscription that allowed for the king's subjects to be conscripted as soldiers in regiments, or as cultivators that allowed for food surplus that enabled redistribution for those that needed it. The Zande kingdoms used trial by ordeal as a means of assessing guilt or innocence when administering justice and law through the use of a poison that was used as an oracle. Dynastic succession under the Zande was a complicated system in which the sons of kings would be given frontier provinces of the kingdom, which allowed for princes to expand their holdings and project authority outwards, creating their own kingdoms. These conquests would lead to the incorporation of Sudanic, Bantu, and Nilotic elements within their kingdoms that were further assimilated via adoption of the Zande language, these kingdoms would span from modern the Central African Republic, to the Democratic Republic of the Congo, to modern South Sudan.

Geographical barriers prevented the spread of Islam into the region. The Dinka people were especially secure in the Sudd marshlands, which protected them from outside interference, and allowed them to remain secure without a large armed forces. The Shilluk, Azande, and Bari people had more regular conflicts with neighbouring states.

== 19th century ==
=== Turko-Egyptian conquest under the Muhammad Ali Dynasty ===
In 1821 the Funj Sultanate to the north collapsed in the face of an invasion by Egypt under the Ottoman Governor Muhammad Ali. The Turko-Egyptian forces then began to move southward after consolidating their control over Kurdufan, and Funjistan. In 1827 Ali Khurshid Pasha led a force through the Dinka lands and in 1830 led an expedition to the junction of the White Nile and the Sobat. The most successful expeditions were led by Admiral Salim Qabudan who between 1839 and 1842 sailed the White Nile, reaching as far south as modern-day Juba.

The Turko-Egyptian forces attempted to set up forts and garrisons in the region, but disease and defection quickly forced them to abandon them. While claimed by the Ottoman Khedives of Egypt, they could not exert any real authority over the region. In 1851, under pressure from foreign powers, the government of Egypt opened the region to European merchants and missionaries.

The Europeans found a large supply of ivory, but found the local Bari had little interest in anything they were selling. As a result, the merchants often turned to force, seizing the ivory, even this proved not to be economical and the merchant ventures had little success. Christian missionaries also established posts in the region, with the Catholic Apostolic Vicariate of Central Africa, that dotted the landscape. The missionaries also had little impact on the region in the early 19th century.

=== Al-Zubayr's trading empire ===
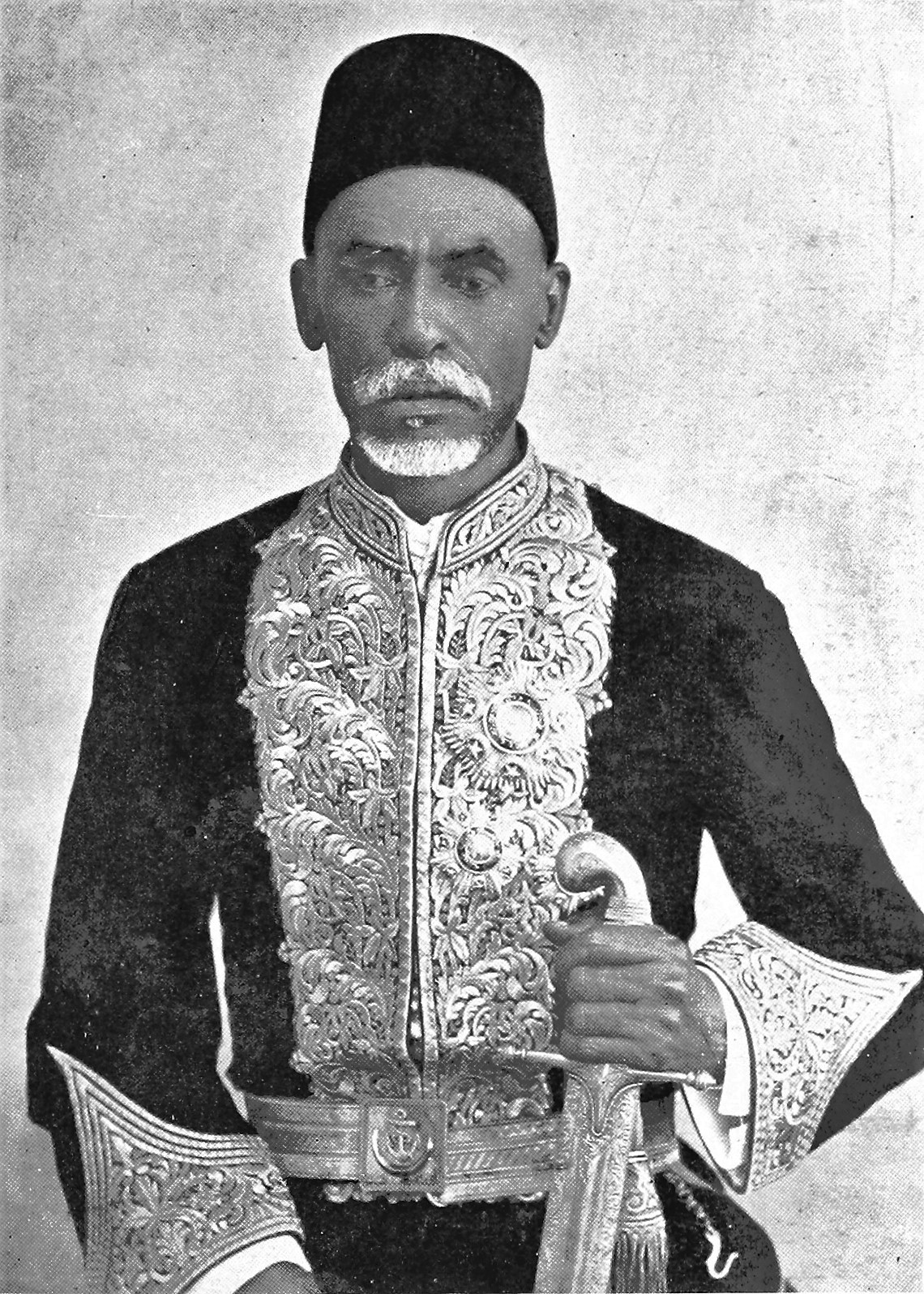
Al-Zubayr Rahma Mansur

The lack of formal authority was filled in the 1850s by a set of powerful merchant princes. In the east Muhammad Ahmad al-Aqqad controlled a large amount of land, but the most powerful was Al-Zubayr Rahma Mansur who came to control the Bahr el Ghazal and other parts of South Sudan. Al-Zubayr was a merchant from Khartoum, who hired his own private army and marched south.

Al-Zubayr and other merchants set up a network of trading forts known as zaribas throughout the region, and from these forts controlled local trade. The most valuable commodity was ivory. In previous centuries Sudanese merchants had not placed a high price on ivory, but the period of Egyptian rule coincided with a great increase in global demand as middle class Americans and Europeans began to purchase pianos and billiard balls.

Slavery was a foundational component of the zariba economy during this period, with the merchants maintaining retinues of slaves as soldiers and laborers. "Turks," Arab-Sudanese merchants, Europeans, and local chiefs all engaged in the slave trade through slave raiding or purchasing from raiders, in order to satisfy their personal demands, as well as to profit by supplying the demand for slaves in Egypt and the wider Ottoman Empire. Engaging successfully in the slave trade also allowed the merchants to pay off debts to their creditors. Long-distance slave trading from South Sudan grew from the 1850s to the 1870s despite abolitionist pressures - one estimate is that 30,000 slaves per year were kidnapped and sent abroad by the mid-1870s.

As such, to manage the Ivory trade al-Zubayr needed labour, and Al-Zubayr captured a significant number of slaves. To his mercenary force, he also conscripted a large slave army. Due to trade disputes with Darfur, al-Zubayr went to war against them and in 1874 defeated their forces and killed Ibrahim, the last Fur sultan prior to the restoration of Ali Dinar.

=== Equatoria ===
The Ottoman Khedive of Egypt, Isma'il Pasha, was concerned over the growing power of al-Zubayr, and established the province of Equatoria and planned to colonize the area. Isma'il hired the British explorer Samuel Baker in 1869 to govern the area, and supplied him with soldiers and financing, but Baker was unable to extend Turko-Egyptian power over the area.

To dispose of Al-Zubayr, Isma'il Pasha dispatched the mercenary leader Muhammad al-Bulalwi and promised him the governorship of Bahr el Ghazal, if he defeated al-Zubayr. Al-Zubayr routed the invaders and killed al-Bulalwi. In 1873, Isma'il Pasha agreed to appoint al-Zubayr as Ottoman governor and declared him al-Zubayr Rahma Mansur Pasha.

Isma'il was still threatened by al-Zubayr and his independent base of power. The British media was also filled with stories about al-Zubayr the "Slaver King." In 1874 Charles George Gordon was appointed the governor of Equatoria. In 1877 al-Zubayr traveled to Cairo to ask for the governorship of Darfur as well but was placed under house arrest by Isma'il. Gordon defeated al-Zubayr's son, ending the merchants' control of the region. Despite this, Gordon still failed to exert authority over any territory in the region beyond the land immediately around his few forts.

In 1878, Gordon was replaced by Emin Pasha. The Mahdist War did not spread south to the non-Muslim areas, but cut off southern Sudan from Egypt, leaving Emin Pasha isolated and without resources. He was rescued by the Emin Pasha Relief Expedition led by Henry Morton Stanley.

Equatoria ceased to exist as an Egyptian outpost in 1889. Important settlements in Equatoria included Lado, Gondokoro, Dufile and Wadelai. Britain then treated southern Sudan as a distinct entity with a different stage of development than the north. This policy was legalized in 1930 by the announcement of the Southern Policy. In 1946 – without consulting southerners – the British administration reversed its Southern Policy and began instead to implement a policy of uniting the north and the south.

== Anglo-Egyptian Condominium ==
Following the Fashoda Incident and the Anglo-Egyptian conferences of 1899, the Anglo-Egyptian Condominium was established and extended its claims of sovereignty over modern day South Sudan and began establishing an administration. Governmental outposts were established and run by British administrators nicknamed "Bog Barons," a name that is a reference to the acronym for the Bahr al-Ghazal. The bulk of government employees in the south were Egyptians, Muslim Sudanese of southern origin, and northern Sudanese.

The early government focused on establishing relations with tribes, settling inter-tribal violence, paving the way for Christian missionaries, clearing the Sudd for navigation, creating a monopoly on the ivory trade, building roads, and raising taxes to fund its administration. All major posts in the south were linked by telegraph in 1908, and wireless transmission was introduced in 1914.

In order to administer the territory, the government appointed chiefs of tribes, who served in the court system and acted as interlocutors between their people and the Anglo-Egyptian government. As chiefs were expected to collect taxes and enforce colonial laws, they often did not hold high status in their communities compared to other local leaders. Furthermore, chiefs were frequently dismissed, banished, replaced, and sometimes even rehabilitated by the government, which debased the system. When chiefs led revolts against the Anglo-Egyptian administration, the government would respond by burning villages and seizing cattle.

The government also imposed corvée labor to supply labour for its construction projects, which were ostensibly a form of payment in lieu of taxes. If locals refused to cooperate, government forces would round them up at night and forcibly conscript them as laborers, after which they would be treated in a similar manner to slaves.

The government was pressured by European missionary organizations to let missionaries into Anglo-Egyptian Sudan. However, missionaries enflamed tensions in the overwhelmingly Muslim north; as such, the government deflected this pressure by sending Christian missionaries to the south, where traditional beliefs were dominant. In 1905, the government issued a decree barring missionary activity north of the 10th parallel, and carved out spheres of influence in the south for different missionary organizations. The Bahr al-Ghazal region was allocated to the Catholics, the majority of the Upper Nile area east of the Bahr al-Zaraf was designated for American missionary organizations, and the remaining territory was assigned to the British Missionary Societies. These groups established missionary schools, which by 1925 housed about 700 pupils.

=== Revolts against Anglo-Egyptian Rule ===
The first twenty years of Anglo-Egyptian rule saw constant indigenous resistance against colonial rule. One example is a 1902 assault by Agar Dinka under Myang Mathiang against a government column, in which the British officer was killed. The government responded with a scorched earth campaign in Agar country, burning villages, seizing cattle, and executing anyone they came across.

The campaign against the Agar intended to serve as an example to neighboring tribes; however, the Atuot people, who were neighbors of the Agar, rose in revolt in 1907 against the government. While their revolt was quelled, the corvée fine imposed on the Atuot led to open revolt in 1909. The government responded again with a scorched earth campaign in Atuot territory, and captured the revolt's leader Ashwol. In 1913 Ashwol was released and reinstated as chief; however, the Atuot rose once again against the British in 1917. This time, when government troops approached, the Atuot scattered their cattle and hid stores of grain in the forest. The men would recollect the cattle at night, and would be resupplied by the women, and neighboring tribes that were "friendly" to the British, did not assist them nor provide any intelligence.

Another instance of revolt was led by Murah Ibrahim from the Kresh people and Andel Abdullahi of the Binga people, who fought from 1908 until 1912 using French territory as a base, until they were defeated at Kafia Kingi.

The government also led campaigns against tribes that raided its allies. For example, in 1912 the "Anuak Patrol," was launched against the warlord Akwei-wo-Cam in response to his raids against their Dinka and Nuer neighbors. This patrol was defeated by the Anuak, and most of the Anuak people remained untaxed by the government through the late 1920s. The government also struggled to defeat the Murle people, who after years of raids against the Bor Dinka, finally submitted in 1912.

The Didinga people in the far southeast did not come under Anglo-Egyptian administration until 1922 following a campaign launched from Uganda by the King's African Rifles, while the Toposa people rose in revolt in 1926 following the establishment of a British post at Kapoeta.

In 1919, 3,000 Aliab Dinka overran a police post near Bor and killed eight policemen, while allied Mundari people attacked telegraph linesmen and police. Led by Kon Anok, they fought back against British expeditions equipped with aircraft and machine guns, and surrendered after the wholesale destruction of their villages and cattle.

=== Southern Policy ===
Following Egypt's independence in 1922 and the assassination of Sudan's governor-general in 1924, British and Egyptian tensions soared. Britain evacuated all Egyptian military personnel from Sudan, drastically reduced the number of Egyptian civilians in Sudan, and took steps to minimize or eliminate the influence of Arabic speakers and Muslims in Southern Sudan. The "Anglo-Egyptian Condominium" by this time was only nominally maintained as a partnership between Egypt and Britain, as all power rested with British authorities.

In the place of dismissed Muslim Sudanese and Egyptian administrators, Sudan's British authorities sought to implement a policy of "indirect rule", in which an indigenous elite would take a much larger role in local government. The colonial administration's specific goals for southern Sudan were articulated in the document Southern Policy, written by Harold MacMichael in 1928.

The Southern Policy sought to promote English rather than Arabic as the Lingua franca, limit Arab immigrant traders from the north, and create an English-speaking, class of administrative, clerical, and technical staff in the south drawn from local tribes. For the first time, expanding southern education became a growing priority for the government. Despite the shift in policy, the budget for government schools always remained small, missionary schools remained dominant, and the first secondary school was only opened in Rumbek in 1949.

Southern Sudan did not see any fighting during World War II, except a few clashes with Italian soldiers on the border between South Sudan and Ethiopia. However, the colonial authorities exported food during this period, causing acute food shortages and famine conditions in different parts of southern Sudan between 1940 and 1945.

== Republic of Sudan ==
=== First Sudanese Civil War ===
On 18 August 1955 the Equatorial Corps garrison in Torit — which was composed of local southern Sudanese — mutinied over the prospects of being replaced with northern Sudanese soldiers. This marked the start of the First Sudanese Civil War, four months before Sudanese independence. Some of the mutineers fled into the wilderness where they began a guerrilla insurgency. In 1962 multiple guerrilla formed the Anyanya which would come to be southern Sudan's largest insurgent group.

Meetings between rebel groups and the Government of Sudan began in Addis Ababa in late 1971 with mediation from the World Council of Churches and the All Africa Conference of Churches. These meetings eventually led to the signing of the Addis Ababa Agreement in 1972 which ended the war and established the Southern Sudan Autonomous Region.

=== Second Sudanese Civil War ===
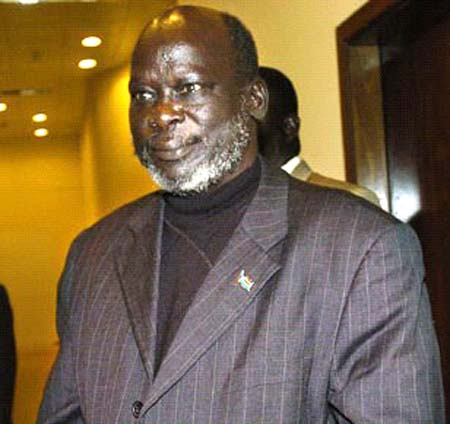
John Garang founded and led the Sudan People's Liberation Army/Movement through the Second Sudanese Civil War.

In 1983, President of Sudan Gaafar Nimeiry declared all of Sudan an Islamic state under Sharia law, including the non-Islamic majority southern region. The Southern Sudan Autonomous Region was abolished on 5 June 1983, ending the Addis Ababa Agreement. In direct response to this, the Sudan People's Liberation Army/Movement (SPLA/M) was formed under the leadership of John Garang, and the Second Sudanese Civil War erupted. Several factions split from the SPLA often along ethnic lines and were funded and armed by Khartoum, with the most notable being the SPLA-Nasir in 1991 led by Riek Machar.

Due to infighting, more southerners died fighting each other than fighting northerners during the war. In the Bor massacre of 1991, an estimated 2,000 civilians were killed by the SPLA-Nasir and armed Nuer civilians and another estimated 25,000 died from the resulting famine in the following years.

In 2005, the Comprehensive Peace Agreement was signed in Machakos, Kenya between the Government of Sudan and the SPLA/M with mediation from the Intergovernmental Authority on Development, Italy, Norway the United Kingdom and the United States. The agreement marked the end of the Second Sudanese Civil War, reestablished the Southern Sudan Autonomous Region and established that a referendum on southern Sudanese independence would be held in 2011.

=== Independence referendum ===
Flag of the Republic of South Sudan

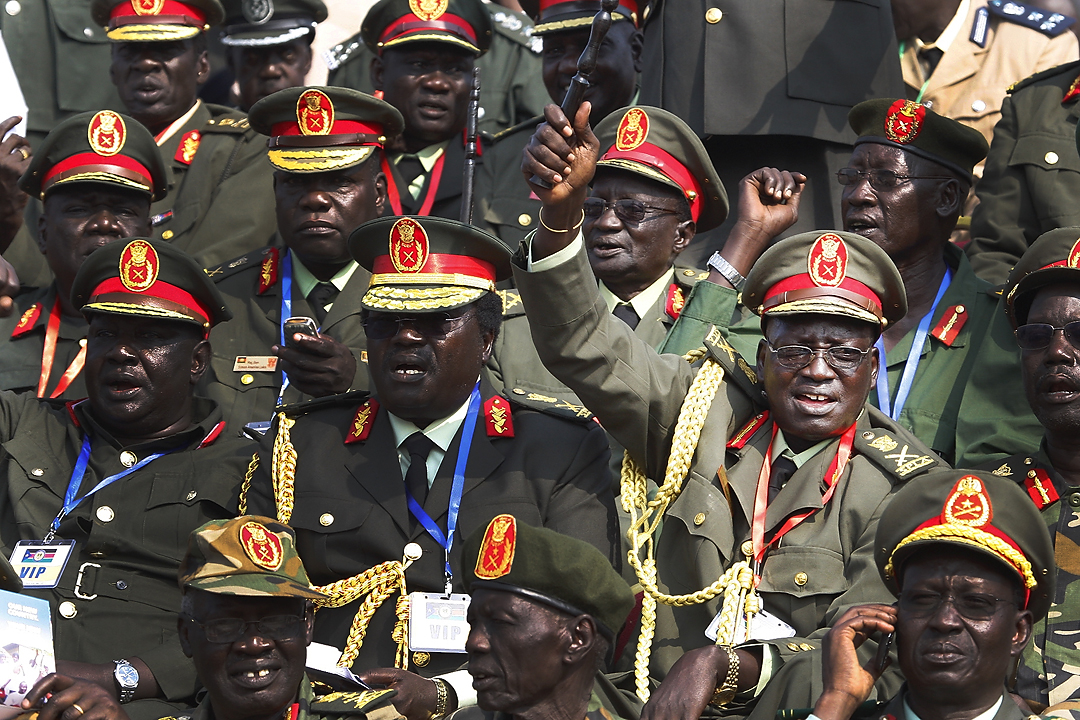
South Sudanese army generals at independence festivities

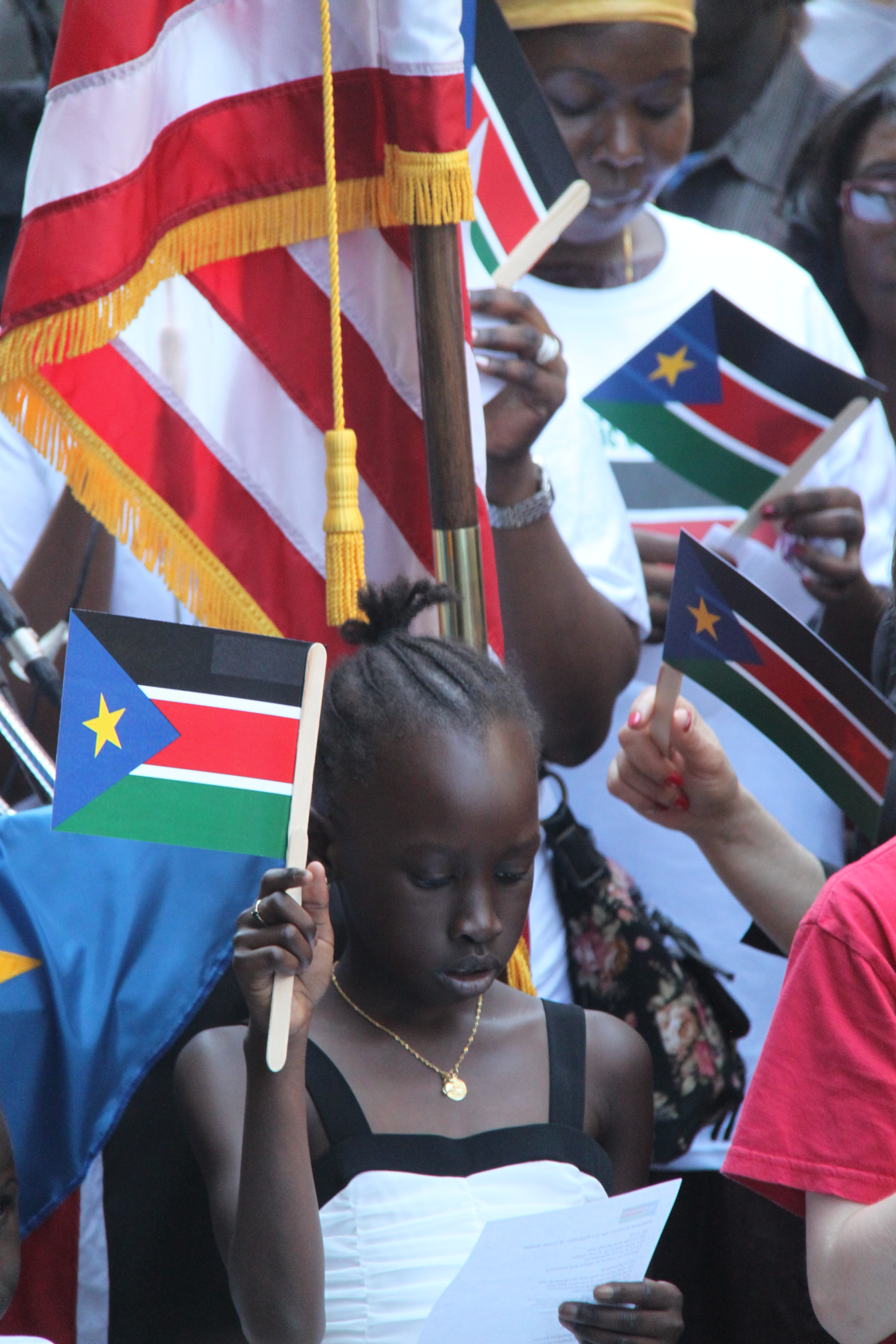
A South Sudanese girl at independence festivities

As promised by the Comprehensive Peace Agreement southern Sudan held an independence referendum in 2011. Voting in the referendum was open from 9 January to 15 January. 98.83% of voters voted in favour of independence with a 99% turnout. At midnight on 9 July 2011, southern Sudan became an independent country under the name "Republic of South Sudan". On 14 July 2011, South Sudan became the 193rd member state of the United Nations and on 28 July 2011, South Sudan joined the African Union as its 54th member state.

Certain disputes still remain with Sudan, such as sharing of the oil revenues, as an estimated 80% of the oil in both Sudans is from South Sudan, which would represent amazing economic potential for one of the world's most deprived areas. The region of Abyei still remains disputed and despite attempts to hold a separate referendum to decide on ownership, a number of issues delayed and ultimately cancelled an official referendum. In July 2011, following a UNSC resolution, Ethiopian peacekeepers began entering the area to prevent the military forces of Sudan and South Sudan from attempting to seize control of the area.

==== South Kordofan conflict ====
On 6 June 2011 armed conflict broke out between the forces of Northern and Southern Sudan, ahead of the scheduled independence of the South on 9 July. This followed an agreement for both sides to withdraw from Abyei.

By late June, several international interlocutors including the United Nations advanced a proposal to base 4,200 Ethiopian soldiers in Abyei to serve as peacekeepers.

== Independence ==
=== Heglig Crisis ===
In March 2012, the Sudanese Air Force bombed areas of the South Sudanese state of Unity, near the border of the Sudanese province of South Kordofan. South Sudanese forces responded by seizing the Heglig oil field on April 10. Sudanese troops launched a counter offensive and forced the South Sudanese Army to withdraw nine days later. On 20 April, South Sudan announced it had begun a phased withdrawal from Heglig, while Sudan claimed it took it by force. Afterwards, Sudanese president Omar al-Bashir held a victory rally in Khartoum.

On 22 April, more fighting broke out on the border as Sudanese soldiers backed by tanks and artillery launched three waves of attacks 10 kilometres (6 mi) deep inside South Sudan. At least one South Sudanese soldier was killed and two wounded in the attack.

The two parties recommenced negotiations in June 2012 under mediation by the African Union's envoy Thabo Mbeki.

On 27 September, Sudanese President Omar al-Bashir and South Sudanese President Salva Kiir signed eight agreements in Addis Ababa, Ethiopia, which led the way to resume important oil exports and create a 10 km (6 mi) demilitarised zone along their border. The agreements allows for the return of 56,000,000 litres (350,000 barrels) of South Sudanese oil to the world market. In addition, the agreements include an understanding on the parameters to follow in regards to demarcating their border, an economic-cooperation agreement and a deal to protect each other's citizens. Certain issues remain unsolved and future talks are scheduled to resolve them. At the same time as the ongoing General debate of the sixty-seventh session of the United Nations General Assembly on the same day, South Sudan was scheduled to speak. Vice President Riek Machar outlined what agreements were signed, but lamented the lack of a resolution on Abyei.

In mid-March 2013, both countries began to withdraw their forces from the border area in a bid to create a demilitarised buffer zone and resume South Sudanese oil production for export through Sudan. In early April South Sudanese oil started to flow through pipelines in Sudan again. Though Sudanese President Omar al-Bashir threatened to cut oil transit through his country from South Sudan, South Sudanese President Salvar Kiir accused him of mobilising for war and said that he would not go to war over the oil transit issue.

=== Tribal conflict ===
In the SPLA/M's attempt to disarm rebellions among the Shilluk and Murle, they burned scores of villages, raped hundreds of women and girls and killed an untold number of civilians. Civilians alleging torture claim fingernails been torn out, burning plastic bags dripped on children to make their parents hand over weapons and villagers burned alive in their huts if rebels were suspected of spending the night there. In May 2011, the SPLA allegedly set fire to over 7,000 homes in Unity State. The UN reports many of these violations and the frustrated director of one Juba-based international aid agency calls them "human rights abuses off the Richter scale".

In 2010, the CIA issued a warning that "over the next five years,...a new mass killing or genocide is most likely to occur in southern Sudan." Inter-ethnic fighting intensified in 2011 in Jonglei state between the Nuer White Army of the Lou Nuer and the Murle. The White Army warned it would also fight South Sudanese and UN forces. The White Army released a statement, to "wipe out the entire Murle tribe on the face of the earth as the only solution to guarantee long-term security of Nuer's cattle." Activists, including Minority Rights Group International, warn of genocide in the current Jonglei conflict.

=== Civil War ===
At independence, South Sudan was at war with at least seven armed groups. According to UN figures, the various conflicts affected nine of its ten states, with tens of thousands displaced. Joseph Kony's Lord's Resistance Army (LRA) also operates in a wide area that includes South Sudan. The fighters accuse the government of plotting to stay in power indefinitely, not fairly representing and supporting all tribal groups while neglecting development in rural areas.

President Salva Kiir alleged that on 14 December 2013, a (largely Nuer) faction of the Sudan People's Liberation Army loyal to former vice president Riek Machar attempted a coup d'état and that the attempt was put down the next day. However, fighting broke out, igniting the South Sudanese Civil War. Machar denied trying to start a coup and fled, calling for Kiir to resign. Ugandan troops were deployed to fight on the side of the Kiir. The United Nations has peacekeepers in the country as part of the United Nations Mission in South Sudan (UNMISS). In January 2014 the first ceasefire agreement was reached. Fighting still continued and would be followed by several more ceasefire agreements. Negotiations were mediated by "IGAD +" (which includes the eight regional nations as well as the African Union, United Nations, China, the EU, USA, UK and Norway). Following a ceasefire agreement in August 2015, known as the "Compromise Peace Agreement", Machar returned to Juba and was sworn in as vice-president. Following a second breakout of violence in Juba, Machar was replaced as vice-president and he fled to Sudan and the conflict erupted again. Rebel in-fighting has become of major part of the conflict. Rivalry among Dinka factions led by the President and Malong Awan have also led to fighting. In August 2018, another power sharing agreement came into effect.

There were ethnic undertones between the Dinka and Nuer in the fighting. About 400,000 people are estimated to have been killed in the war, including notable atrocities such as the 2014 Bentiu massacre. More than 4 million people have been displaced, with about 1.8 million of those internally displaced, and about 2.5 million having fled to neighboring countries, especially Uganda and Sudan.

== See also ==
- History of Sudan
- History of Africa
- List of heads of state of South Sudan
- National Archives of South Sudan
- Politics of South Sudan
