= James Nando =

- Born: 1970 or 1972; Ezo, Sudan
- Allegiance: Arrow Boys; SPLM-IO (until 2020); SSPDF
- Rank: Major General
- Conflicts: South Sudanese Civil War; Central African Republic Civil War

James Nando Mark (born 1970 or 1972) is a South Sudanese general, warlord, and former rebel.

== Biography ==
Belonging to the Azande, Nando was born in 1970 or 1972 in Ezo. He joined the Arrow Boys in an unknown year and served as the group's commander in Andari and Ezo. He then joined SPLM-IO in an unknown year and served as the deputy of Alfred Futiyo Karaba. While serving as the commander of SPLM-IO, he was accused of recruiting children into his ranks, a claim that he denied, and azandes from the Democratic Republic of the Congo. He later atoned for the crimes that his forces committed during the conflict to the people of Tambura. He defected from SPLM-IO on 26 March 2020 and joined SSPDF. The Vungara clan politicians based in Juba were reportedly influenced him to leave SPLM-IO. According to him, the reason behind his defection was because of Machar's neglect of SPLA-IO in Western Equatoria.

After defecting from SPLM-IO, Nando's forces were absorbed into SSPDF Division 6, and he tried to recruit soldiers from his village. Furthermore, he also supported Azande youth militia that fought against former Seleka. On 8 November 2020, Nando forces attacked UPC rebels in Bambouti after the group incursion to South Sudan. SSPDF troops led by Nando carried out an attack against Balanda people in Source Yubu in March 2021 and kidnapped seven civilians in Nabiama in May. On 17 June 2021, Nando's forces attacked SPLM-IO barracks in Namutina. He then moved his base to Renzi Primary School in Tambura in mid-August 2021.

On 14 October 2021, he secretly left Tambura for Ezo after hearing that the government would order him to move from the town. During his trip to Ezo, the rebels attacked Nando forces in Source Yubu, forcing him to flee to the jungle. Later, Nando was transferred to Juba and put under house arrest whereas his forces were relocated from Tambura to Maridi County. In 2023, the US Treasury and the UK government imposed sanctions on him over accusations of sexual violence. In February 2025, he was released from house arrest, and Kiir ordered him to eradicate SPLM-IO checkpoints along the Tambura–Wau Road.

After the resignation of Alfred Futiyo Karaba as Governor of Western Equatoria, Nando forces attacked Futiyo's house, causing him to flee to an SPLA-IO base in Li Rangu. Subsequently, he entered Yambio and arrested several opposition figures. He also attacked the SPLA-IO camp in northern Tambura and pursued Futiyo. His forces also burned Balanda politicians' houses and attacked Futiyo's birthplace, Nadiangere. In August 2025, his forces were based in Maridi County.

== Bibliography ==
- UNMISS (1 March 2022). ATTACKS ON CIVILIANS IN TAMBURA COUNTY: June - September 2021 (PDF) (Report). UNMISS.
