= Gbudwe State =

State of South Sudan from 2015 to 2020

- State
- Location of Gbudwe State in South Sudan before the split of Tombura State in 2017
- Country: South Sudan
- Capital: Yambio
- Number of Counties: 13

Population (2008)
  - Total: 364,272

Gbudwe State was a state of South Sudan that existed between 2 October 2015 and 22 February 2020. It was created from Western Equatoria state. Tambura State was split from Gbudwe State on January 14, 2017. Gbudwe State was located in the Equatoria region. Gbudwe bordered the states of Lol, Maridi, Tambura, and Western Lakes, and also the province of Haut-Uélé in the Democratic Republic of the Congo and Haut-Mbomou in the Central African Republic. The state had a population of 364,272 in 2008.

== History ==
Before the creation of the state, Gbudwe State was part of Western Equatoria. On 2 October 2015, President Salva Kiir issued a decree establishing 28 states in place of the 10 constitutionally established states. The decree established the new states largely along ethnic lines. A number of opposition parties and civil society groups challenged the constitutionality of the decree. Kiir later resolved to take it to parliament for approval as a constitutional amendment. In November the South Sudanese parliament empowered President Kiir to create new states.

Patrick Raphael was appointed Governor on 24 December 2015.

On 22 February 2020, a peace deal ending the South Sudanese Civil War reverted the 28 states back into the original 10 states. Gbudwe State has since been reincorporated into Western Equatoria.

== Geography ==
Gbudwe State is located in the Equatoria region and the state bordered the states of Wau State to the north, Lol State to the northwest, Tonj State to the northeast, as well as the Congolese province of Haut-Uélé to the south, Maridi State to the east, the Central African region of Haut-Mbomou to the west, and Western Lakes State to the northeast.

=== Administrative divisions ===
After the original states split up, Gbudwe State broke down even further for a total of 13 counties in the state. The 13 counties are part of the 180 counties in South Sudan. Also, each county receives a county commissioner. The 13 counties are consisted of the following:

- Former Nzara County:
  - Basukangbi
  - Nzara
  - Sakure
- Former Ezo County:
  - Ezo
  - Naandi
- Former Nagero County:
  - Nagero
- Former Tombura County:
  - Mopoi
  - Ri-Yubu
  - Tombura
- Former Yambio County:
  - Bangazagino
  - Bangasu
  - Yambio

=== Towns and cities ===
The capital of Gbudwe State was Yambio, located in Yambio County. The city had an estimated population of around 31,700 in 2011. Other towns and villages in the state include Ezo, Nzara, and Tombura.
