= Nzara County =

- County
- Location of Nzara County in South Sudan
- Coordinates: 4.647°N 28.258°E
- County: South Sudan
- Region: Equatoria
- State: Western Equatoria
- Headquarters: Nzara

Population (2017 estimate)
  - Total: 85,146
- Time zone: UTC+2 (CAT)

Nzara County is a county in Western Equatoria State, South Sudan. It was part of Yambio county before South Sudan's independence.

== History ==
Nzara County was part of Western Equatoria State when South Sudan became independent. Nzara County became part of Gbudwe State in 2015, but reverted to Western Equatoria State when that state was reestablished in 2020.

In 2018, 20 of the 21 public primary schools in the county were closed due to unpaid teacher salaries. In February 2020, a wildfire in Nzara County killed one person and left hundreds homeless. Nzara County experienced heavy flooding in November 2020 when the Yubu River overflowed, destroying 70 homes.

== Geography ==
Nzara County borders Ezo County to the west, Yambio County to the east bored by Ri Rongu, Wulu County to the north, and the Democratic Republic of the Congo to the south. The Nzara River runs through the county. Nzara and Sakura are the two major towns in the county.

== Climate of Nzara ==
- Attitude/Elevation 616.08m (2021.26ft)
- Annual high temperature 31.37 °C (88.47 °F)
- Annual low temperature 20.41 °C (68.74 °F)
- Average annual precip. 200.11mm (7.88in)
- Warmest month February (36.45 °C / 97.61 °F)
- Coldest Month August (18.69 °C / 65.64 °F)
- Wettest Month October (399.16 mm / 15.71 in)
- Driest Month January (8.1 mm / 0.32 in)
- Number of days with rainfall (≥ 1.0 mm) 220.38 days (60.38%)
- Days with no rain 144.62 days (39.62%)
