= Kotobi, South Sudan =

Kotobi
- Location in South Sudan
- Coordinates: 05°15′28″N 30°12′39″E
- Country: South Sudan
- Region: Equatoria
- State: Western Equatoria
- County: Mundri West County
- Payam: Kotobi
- Time zone: UTC+2 (CAT)

Kotobi is a village situated in Western Equatoria, South Sudan.

== History ==
SPLA captured Kotobi during the Second Sudanese Civil War. Two SAF helicopters struck Kotobi on 23 August 1996, killing five people, wounding 45, and destroying the Episcopal Church. The church later was renovated and service was resumed in November 1997 The village was bombarded in March 2000. Due to the ethnic conflict between Moru and Dinka in Mundri, the village's security status was raised to level 4 ("no go").

The government included Kotobi to Amadi State in October 2015 after its formation. Armed groups attacked Kotobi around 2017, burning houses and causing the residents to flee from the village. In September 2023, floods swept the village, destroying houses and displacing the villagers.

== Education ==
Kotobi has one primary and secondary school. The former was destroyed due to the 2017 attack.

== Healthcare ==
The village has one hospital dedicated for first and second stage patients. The hospital was one of two health facilities in Mundri West County that was operated in February 2016. In February 2018, the hospital was out of service.
