= Juba County =

- County
- Counties of Central Equatoria State
- Country: South Sudan
- State: Central Equatoria
- Seat: Juba
- Payam: 13 payams

Area
  - Total: 18,362 km^{2} (7,090 sq mi)

Population (2017 estimate)
  - Total: 525,953
  - Density: 28.644/km^{2} (74.186/sq mi)
- Time zone: UTC+2 (CAT)

Juba County is an administrative area in Central Equatoria state, South Sudan. It is the largest county in Central Equatoria and one of the largest in the region of Equatoria. Its county seat is Juba, the national capital of the South Sudan.

Its population according to the 2008 census conducted by Sudan, prior to South Sudanese independence, was 372,413.

The current commissioner for Juba County is Ustaz. Emmanuel. He was appointed vide Republic Decree by President Salva Kiir as part of the Revitalised Transitional Government of National Unity (RTGoNU).

== Political geography ==
As of 2011, the county's Payams, or sub-counties, included Bungu, Dollo (or Dolo), Ganji, Gondokoro, Lirya, Lo'bonok, Lokiliri, Mangalla (or Mangala), Northern Bari, Rejaf, Rokon, Tijor, and Wonduruba, the latter of which was administrated by Central Equatoria state. Former payams that became defunct before independence included Jokala, Juba, Kator, and Muniki. In March 2011, Juba, Kator, and Muniki payams were consolidated into Juba proper under the administration of the Juba City Council.

The county also included part of Bandingilo National Park in its northeast. It borders Terekeka County to its north and Lainya and Kajo Keji counties to its south, as well as Mundri East and Mundri West counties in the state of Western Equatoria to its west, and Eastern Equatoria, namely Lafon, Magwi, and Torit counties, to its east.

== History ==
In August 2005, independence leader John Garang's funeral took place in Juba County. The month was also marked by ethnic violence in Juba and its environs.

The villages of Katigiri and Wonduruba were inundated with refugees internally displaced by violence and looting in Juba County in February 2008. At least 750 people from Katigiri also relocated to Juba, the de facto metropolis of the county, during the looting. The United Nations, the county commissioner, and local militias responded to the situation.

The county was the site of a month-and-a-half-long teachers' strike in November and December 2009 over furloughed salaries. The strike was resolved after the wages were paid.

After the reorganisation of states decreed by President Salva Kiir in 2015, Juba County became the Jubek State. In February 2016, the governor of the state decreed the creation of 7 new counties from the territory of the former county.
