= Source Yubu =

- Location in South Sudan
- Coordinates: 05°23′34″N 27°15′25″E
- Country: South Sudan
- Region: Equatoria
- State: Western Equatoria
- County: Tambura County
- Payam: Source Yubu
- Time zone: UTC+2 (CAT)

Source Yubu (also known as Ri-Yubu) is a village located near the border of Central African Republic - South Sudan in Western Equatoria, South Sudan.

== History ==
Due to the sleeping sickness outbreak in Zandeland in 1918, Source Yubu was founded in 1920 as a place to treat sleeping sickness patients.

Anyanya rebels commanded by Ferdinand Goi Ukelo (also spelled Goyi) of the Balanda tribe attacked Source Yubu in 1965. Goi managed to steal a gun from a police officer, start a coup, and kill 18 men single handed with a machine gun. His right hand was paralyzed, so he had to learn to use his left hand. He is noted to have asked his family and friends not for food, nor water or supplies, but instead for batteries so he could listen to classical music while taking out enemies.

The SPLA captured Source Yubu on 2 December 1991.

The LRA attacked Joint Integrated Units forces in Source Yubu on 1 March 2007. Having a superior number over its adversary, the LRA managed to loot shops and civilian properties in the town. Almost one year later, on 19 February 2008, the LRA attacked Source Yubu. They killed four civilians and seven SPLA soldiers. Further, the militias abducted 27 people, burned 70 houses and a trading center, and looted villagers' properties.

The LRA raided Source Yubu on 4 February 2011. They killed four and abducted seven villagers.

In early November 2015, the clash between the SSPDF and the armed youth group ensued in Source Yubu, causing most of the residents to flee to Bambouti and later Obo. House burning and looting occurred during the clash.

In late March 2021, SSPDF forces loyal to General James Nando and the Azande militia group attacked Balanda civilians and ex-SPLM/A-IO affiliates in Source Yubu, causing 41 Balanda households to flee the village.

A clash between the SSPDF and an armed group from the Central African Republic ensued in Source Yubu on 23 March 2023. As a result, three soldiers were wounded and were transferred to Tumbura.

== Education ==
There is one primary school in the village.

== Infrastructure ==
Source Yubu has a migration office that was opened in 2012.

== Healthcare ==
The village has one health center. Belgium's government supported and funded Source Yubu health center until 1989.
