= Avokaya language =

Central Sudanic language spoken in Central Africa

Avokaya
- Ãvõkáyã
- Native to: South Sudan, Democratic Republic of the Congo
- Region: (SS) West Equatoria (DRC) Haut-Uele
- Ethnicity: Avukaya
- Native speakers: (100,000 cited 1989–2017)
- Language family: Nilo-Saharan?: Central Sudanic; East; Moru–Madi; Central; Avokaya
- Dialects: Ojila; Ajugu
- Writing system: Latin

Language codes
- ISO 639-3: avu
- Glottolog: avok1242

Avokaya (also spelled Abukeia, Avukaya, or, in Arabic script, ابوكية) is a Central Sudanic language spoken in southern South Sudan and parts of the Democratic Republic of Congo.

== Demographics ==
Avokaya speakers occupy a contiguous area along both sides of the South Sudan-Congo international boundary, with Maridi in South Sudan and Faradje in Congo as the main centres of the language. In 2002, the number of Avokaya speakers in South Sudan was estimated to be 40,000, replacing the inaccurate 1982 estimate of 15,000. However, the 1989 estimate of 25,000 speakers in the Congo still stands.

A 2013 survey reported that ethnic Avukaya reside in the following bomas of South Sudan.

- Mambe Boma, Mambe Payam, Maridi County
- Olo Boma, Mambe Payam, Maridi County
- Avokaya Boma, Tore Payam, Yei County

== Dialects ==
Avokaya's two main dialects are Ajugu, which is spoken in the border area of the two countries south of Maridi, and Ojila, which is spoken in the region between the Naam (Era) and Olo rivers, and slightly east of there. These two dialects are spoken in both countries, with the smaller dialects of Northern Ogambi and Avokaya Pur spoken only in the Faradje region, Congo. Avokaya is closest to Logo, especially in the Northern Ogambi dialect (whereas the Ogambi dialect is a dialect of Logo rather than Avokaya. A high degree of code switching exists among Avokaya and Logo speakers in the Faradje region.

== Phonology ==
Consonants
| | | Labial | Alveolar | Retroflex | Palatal | Velar | Labial–velar | Glottal |
|---|---|---|---|---|---|---|---|---|
| Nasal | | m | n | | ɲ ⟨ny⟩ | ŋ | | |
| Plosive | voiceless | p | t | ʈ ⟨tr⟩ | t͡ʃ ⟨c⟩ | k | k͡p ⟨kp⟩ | ʔ ⟨ʼ⟩ |
| Plosive | voiced | b | d | ɖ ⟨dr⟩ | d͡ʒ ⟨j⟩ | ɡ ⟨g⟩ | ɡ͡b ⟨gb⟩ | |
| Plosive | prenasalized | ᵐb ⟨mb⟩ | ⁿd ⟨nd⟩ | ᶯɖ ⟨ndr⟩ | ⁿd͡ʒ ⟨nj⟩ | ᵑɡ ⟨ng⟩ | ᵑᵐɡ͡b ⟨ngb⟩ | |
| Implosive | | ɓ ⟨ʼb⟩ | ɗ ⟨ʼd⟩ | | | | | |
| Fricative | voiceless | f | s | | | | | h |
| Fricative | voiced | v | z | | | | | |
| Fricative | prenasalized | ᶬv ⟨mv⟩ | | | | | | |
| Approximant | plain | | l | ɻ⁓ɽ ⟨r⟩ | j ⟨y⟩ | | w | |
| Approximant | glottalic | | | | ˀj ⟨ʼy⟩ | | ˀw ⟨ʼw⟩ | |

Vowels
| | Front | Central | Back |
|---|---|---|---|
| Close | i ⟨ị⟩ | | ʊ⁓u ⟨u⟩ |
| Close-mid | ɪ ⟨i⟩ | | ʊ⁓u ⟨u⟩ |
| Mid | e | ə ⟨ạ⟩ | o |
| Open | | a | |

== Orthography ==
Avokaya alphabet
| a | ạ | b | ʼb | c | d | ʼd | dr | e | f | g | gb | h | i | ị | j | k | kp | l | m | mb | mv |
| n | nd | ndr | ng | ngb | nj | ny | ŋ | o | p | r | s | t | tr | u | v | w | ʼw | y | ʼy | z | ʼ |

Tones are indicated using diacritics:

- High tone is indicated with an acute accent over the vowel: ⟨á, ạ́, é, í, ı̣́, ó, ú⟩;
- Mid tone is indicated with a circumflex accent over the vowel: ⟨â, ậ, ê, î, ı̣̂, ô, û⟩;
- Low tone is indicated with a tilde over the vowel: ⟨ã, ạ̃, ẽ, ĩ, ı̣̃, õ, ũ⟩;
- Rising tone is indicated over two vowels by combining the tilde and the circumflex accent: ⟨ãâ, ạ̃ậ, ẽê, ĩî, ı̣̃ı̣̂, õô, ũû⟩.

== Multilingualism ==
In Maridi, there is much bilingualism and intermarriage with speakers of Baka (a West Central Sudanic language) and Mündü (an Ubangian language). Juba, Sudanese Arabic and English are used for wider communication by speakers in Sudan, while, in the Congo, speakers tend to use Swahili, Lingala and French.
