= Terekeka =

- Location in South Sudan
- Coordinates: 5.448926°N 31.752398°E
- Country: South Sudan
- Region: Equatoria
- State: Central Equatoria
- County: Terekeka County
- Time zone: UTC+2 (CAT)
- Climate: Aw

Terekeka is a community in Central Equatoria, South Sudan. It is the headquarters of Terekeka County.

Terekeka town lies on the western bank of the Nile, 53 miles north of Juba town. It is almost the capital of the Mundari people also known as the Mondari or Mandari.

Terekeka is the birthplace of Clement Wani Konga, who was governor of Central Equatoria state from 2004 to 2015.
