= Kenneth Grant Fraser =

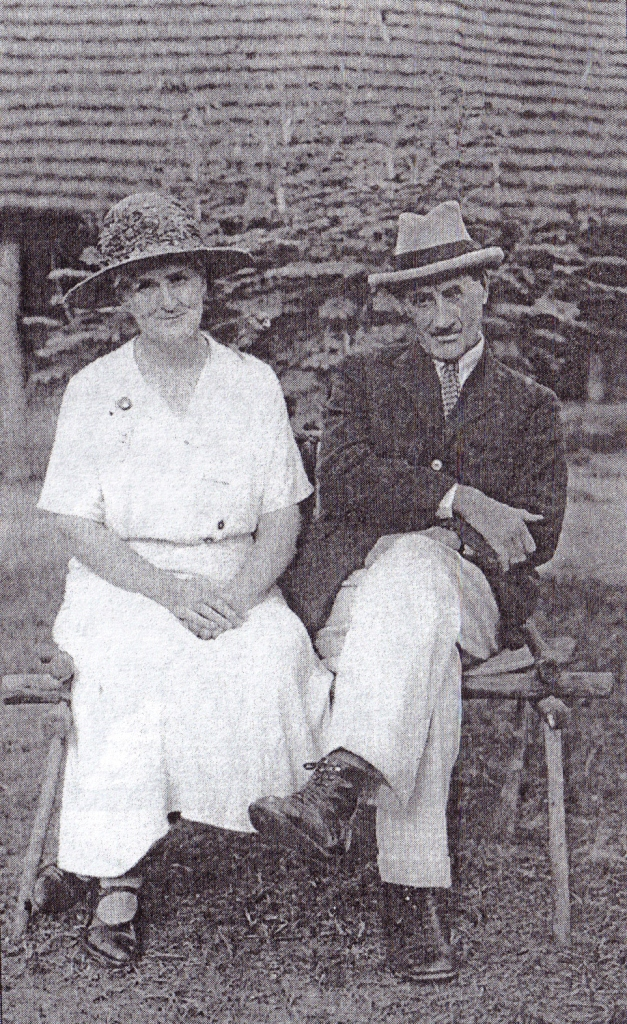
Dr Kenneth and Mrs Eileen Fraser outside their house in Lui

Kenneth Grant Fraser O.B.E., M.D., Edin., D.P.H., F.R.C.S.E. or "Dr Fraser" as he is commonly remembered, was a Scottish missionary doctor and educator in Southern Sudan, specifically working among the Moru people.

He was born in 1877 in Scotland. He died in Lui, South Sudan on 10 February 1935.

== Early life ==
Fraser was born at Crock Ban on the Isle of Lewis in Scotland in 1877, the son of George Fraser. His parents died early and so he grew up with his uncle and went to school with his cousins. At the age of 14 he ran away from home and joined the army as a drummer boy. He was converted to be a committed Christian while serving in South Africa during the Boer War, through overhearing some officers discuss spirituality. After his conversion he continued in the army, but began to develop a vision of service as a missionary. While serving in Asia, probably Ceylon, he first met his future wife Eileen Galbraith, the sister of a British officer, Alexander Norman Galbraith (1879–1915) and fell in love with her, but he was then only a sergeant, and she turned down his proposal.

On returning to Scotland, Fraser enrolled in evening school and did well, going on to study medicine at Edinburgh and Glasgow, qualifying in July 1914 with the express aim of becoming a medical missionary. After completing his study he again proposed to Eileen, and this time she accepted. Eileen had meanwhile had a period teaching, together with her elder half sister Alice, in Sudan at Omdurman and Wad Medani, and while there had learnt Arabic. They married on 30 November 1916 at St Simon Zealote's, Chelsea. Eileen was the daughter of Ven. Henry Galbraith, Archdeacon of Glendalough, County Wicklow, Ireland.

During the First World War Fraser again saw active service with the Royal Army Medical Corps in Western Europe and Turkey, ending the war as a major. He was awarded the Croix de Guerre in 1917. Eileen enrolled as a nurse and served in France from February to July 1916 with the British Committee of the French Red Cross. After the war Fraser went on to complete his medical training by studying surgery qualifying as F.R.C.S. in Edinburgh in 1920. It was this background that the Frasers brought to their missionary service. It enabled Fraser to develop a strategy, which drew heavily on his military experience, that the Holy Spirit was able to use to establish the church throughout Moru country.

== A Missionary in Sudan ==
Fraser and his wife arrived in the Moru country on 22 December 1920, about ten years after the area became part of Sudan. They settled in Lui, which was chosen as being close to permanent water but away from fly-infested rivers.

== A clear missionary strategy ==
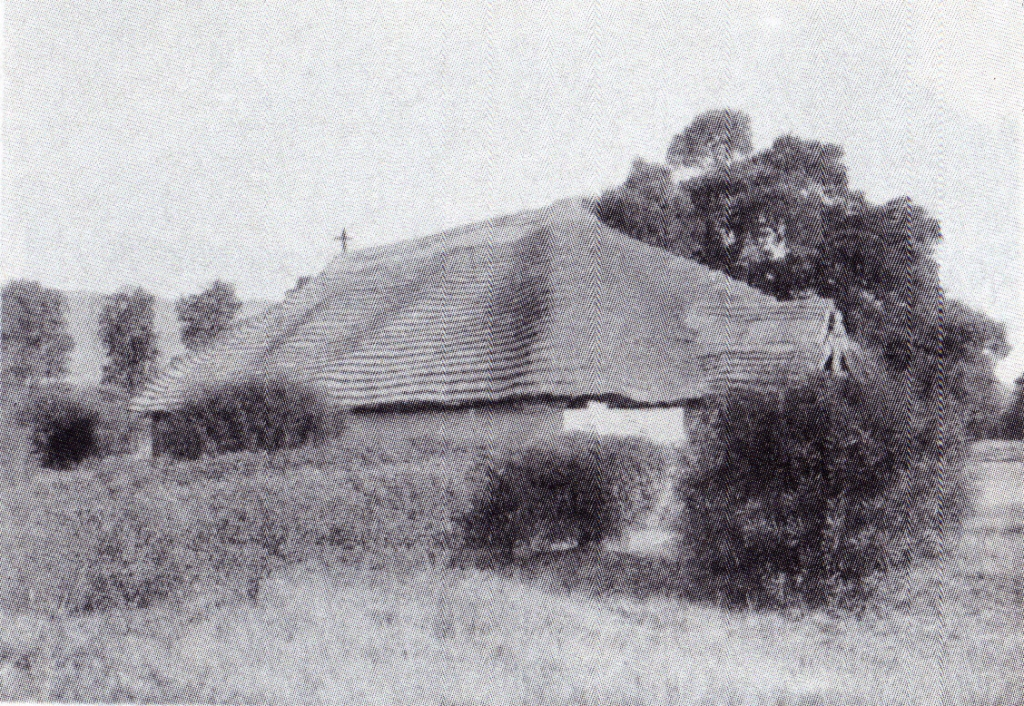
The church in Lui at the time of Dr Fraser

The way the church developed in Moru country resulted from the strategy that Fraser applied, interacting with the nature of the culture of the Moru people, and guided by the Holy Spirit. Fraser's strategy reflected his experience as a soldier, together with his skills as a doctor, a teacher and a preacher. The work he was involved in shows an understanding of the completeness of man combined with a clear strategy of reaching out to the people God had given him to work with. Fraser was a strong man with a strong character, and as a keen hunter had important characteristics respected by the Moru people. He was also seen by them as someone who was close to God.

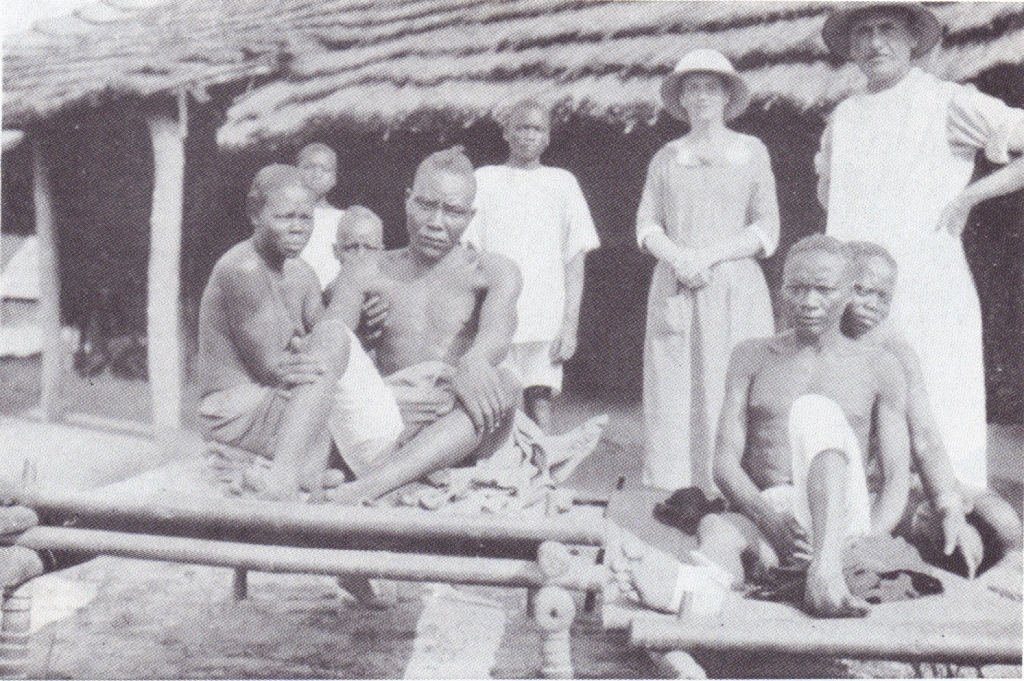
Patients at Lui hospital in 1923, having been wounded by lions

As a medical doctor, Fraser began work on the hospital immediately he arrived, so that he managed to complete the first temporary buildings within five months of arrival. Even before the hospital building was completed the Frasers began to build a small temporary school building, and started teaching a few boys. Alongside they started preaching and bringing the gospel.

An important part of Fraser's strategy was moving out from the centre into the whole of the Moru, and neighbouring Jur and Avokaya areas, and he did this as soon as he had local people to do so. When work was started at a new centre two people, Andarea Apaya and Danyele Parongwa, were sent together. One of the pair was a dresser and the other a teacher, but working closely together. On Sundays they would both work together in preaching and establishing the local church. Fraser provided them with standardised medical kits and specific routines and procedures were established. The teams were required to send back reports to Fraser at Lui hospital at regular intervals. By his death in 1935 Fraser had managed to get a coverage of what is now Mundri county, with eleven dispensaries, based at the chiefs' areas. The foundation had been set for a policy that, with slight modifications, continued to be the basis of the mission work in Moru country up until the medical and educational work was taken over by the government in 1957 and 1958.

This strategy has led to a number of important effects in the way Moru society has developed and the way the Moru view development.

- Local Missionary Outreach. Local people were used as missionaries and managed to spread the work throughout the district with no missionaries outside Lui. This helped make it truly Moru.
- Self-Reliance. Fraser delegated much of the work from an early stage, making maximum use of those who had been through the school in Lui from an early stage. This helped foster a sense of local ownership and self-reliance.
- Cover of the Whole Moru Area. Unlike some other areas of Southern Sudan, one does not find that all the educated Morus come from one part of the area. Education and development spread throughout the area.
- Unity of the Moru People. In only a relatively few years the Moru people moved from disunited, fearful groups to being united as Christians and have maintained a cohesiveness ever since.
- Reaching the Whole Man. Fraser's approach of bringing together the church, the school and the hospital has been seen as a strategy reaching out to the whole man. This can be seen as ministering to the body (hospital), mind (school) and spirit (church), in a holistic way. It is probably this factor as much as any other that has influenced the Moru view of development.
- Importance of Medicine to the Moru. Medicine has been closely associated with education in the mind of many Morus. The result has been many Moru medical personnel, (as well as other scientific disciplines) and a great respect for medicine as a calling.
- Significance of Individual Christians for Local Development. It was the teachers and dressers who were the first animateurs for development in most rural communities, while also bringing the gospel with their work. Key Christian individuals are still important in bringing change and motivation to the various communities.
- The Church as an Internalised and Indigenous Structure. Throughout the turmoil that has effected Sudan on and off since the 1950s the church has proved particularly significant as the one structure that is indigenous and continues regardless of what is going on round about.
- Social rather than Economic Development. One of the very few criticisms heard of Fraser from any Morus was that his work was devoid of any economic development programme. This however may reasonably be seen as outside the scope of his work.

== Heritage ==
The graves of Fraser and his sister-in-law beside the church in Lui, Sudan

Looking back at the development of the Moru church, Fraser's strategy was crucial in the way the church spread throughout the Moru people and its effect on the outlook of the whole tribe.

Many Moru schoolchildren over the years have wanted to follow him and become medical doctors. As a result, they enter the 'science' stream. Those who have not become doctors have become medical professionals at other levels, or entered professions like agriculture as a result of this desire to follow his example.

Lui Hospital is still an important hospital is Southern Sudan.

Both Kenneth and Fraser are common baptismal names amongst the Morus even today, reflecting the high esteem he is still held in amongst these people. When Morus visit Britain they are keen to visit Edinburgh where Fraser trained.
