= Patrick Zamoi =

South Sudanese politician

Patrick Zamoi was the Governor of South Sudan’s Western Equatoria State when the State was divided into 6 different states then later appointed as the Governor of then Tombura State.

== Controversy ==
Patrick Zamoi has been accused of using President Salva Kiir's name to confiscate citizens’ properties in the state including the family of former Western Equatoria Governor Joseph Bangasi Bakosoro and also declared an open war to clear the resistant youth in the western Equatoria State.
