= Jur Modo people =

Ethnic group in South Sudan

Regions with significant populations
- South Sudan; Western Equatoria State

Languages
- Jur Modo

Religion
- animism

Related ethnic groups
- Jur Beli

The Jur Modo are an ethnic group in South Sudan. They have a rural way of life, living in relatively isolated compounds near Mvolo County, Western Equatoria State. They speak Jur Modo language, a Nilo-Saharan language, though some speakers also use Arabic, Dinka, Moru, Baka, or Zande. The Jur Modo traditionally practice animism.

== Books ==
- Jur Mödö – English Dictionary with Grammar, Andrew Persson and Janet R. Persson), Nairobi, Kenya: S.I.L.-Sudan, 1991
