= Tumbura Airport =

- IATA: n/a; ICAO: HSTU

Summary
- Airport type: Public, Civilian
- Owner: Civil Aviation Authority of South Sudan
- Serves: Tumbura, South Sudan
- Location: Tumbura, South Sudan
- Elevation AMSL: 2,230 ft / 680 m
- Coordinates: 05°36′00″N 27°28′21″E

Map
- Location of Tumbura Airport in South Sudan

Runways
Direction	Length		Surface
Direction	ft	m	Surface
	4,091	1,247	Unpaved

Tumbura Airport is an airport serving Tumbura in South Sudan.

== Location ==
Tumbura Airport (IATA: n/a, ICAO: HSTU) is located in Tumbura County in the town of Tumbura in Western Equatoria, near the International borders with the Democratic Republic of the Congo and the Central African Republic. This location lies approximately 465 kilometres (289 mi), by air, northwest of Juba International Airport, the largest airport in South Sudan. The geographic coordinates of Tumbura Airport are: 5° 36' 0.00" N, 27° 28' 21.00"E (Latitude: 5.6000; Longitude: 27.4725). This airport is situated 680 metres (2,230 ft) above sea level. It has a single unpaved runway, which measures 1,247 metres (4,091 ft) in length.

== Overview ==
Tumbura Airport is a small civilian airport that serves the town of Tumbura and surrounding communities. There are no scheduled airline flights at Tumbura Airport.

== See also ==
- Tumbura
- Western Equatoria
- Equatoria
- List of airports in South Sudan
