= Avukaya people =

Ethnic group of South Sudan

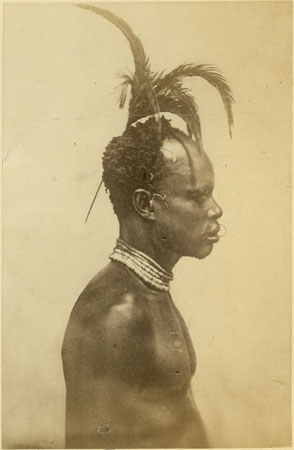
Avokaya late 1870s

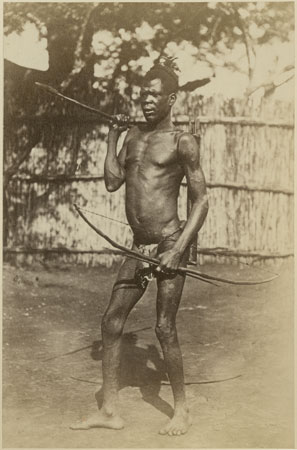
Avokaya man with bow and spear

The Avukaya are an ethnic group of South Sudan. Approximately 50,000 Avukaya reside in South Sudan. Some have fled to the Democratic Republic of the Congo due to persecution. Many members of this ethnic group belong to the Christian minority of South Sudan. The Avukaya traditionally live in a rainforest area in Equatoria close to the Democratic Republic of Congo in Southern Sudan.

Historically, the Avokaya people are originally from Maridi town, Mambe, Bahr-Olo and Amaki. Besides Maridi, the Avukaya people are found in Tore Payam, Yei town, Bangolo Payam in Mundri West and other towns of the Sudan too. The Avokaya are the group of ethnic tribes that combined with the Moru on the mountains to put an end to the King Gbudwe of the Azande invasion of their territory. They are known for a dance called Mamburuku and socialisation with other tribes. Many speak Pa-Zande, Moru and Baka languages in addition to Avokaya.

The Avukaya commonly enjoy Pirinda with Nyasa (food made of sorghum or millet or cassava flour). They also like some wild fruits Omi and Kaniki) and yams.
