= Jur Modo =

Jur Modo may refer to:

- the Jur Modo people
- the Jur Modo language
