= Joseph Nyiegele Pacifo =

South Sudanese politician

Joseph Nyiegele Pacifo was the Governor of Amadi State, South Sudan after 24 December 2015. He was the first governor of the state, which was created by President Salva Kiir on 2 October 2015.
