= Terekeka County =

- County
- Central Equatoria State Counties
- Country: South Sudan
- State: Central Equatoria
- Headquarters: Terekeka

Population (2008)
  - Total: 140,396
- Time zone: UTC+2 (CAT)

Terekeka County is an administrative division of Central Equatoria in South Sudan. It is the capital of surrounding Mundari and Boma counties. It lies on both the east and west bank of the White Nile north of Juba The word "Terekeka" is a combination of two words; "Tirgigi", a kind of hard shrub and "Terere" an open hard ground usually found in the middle of shrub trees. The local referral of "Terere i Tirgigi lukata" became shortened and distorted to create the current name, "Terekeka".

The current commissioner for Terekeka County is Warnyank Lukö Buyu who replaced James Lino Malou in a republican decree by President Salva Kiir in November 2022.

== Location ==
Terekeka County is located at the northern edge of Central Equatoria State. It borders Juba County to the south, Western Equatoria State to the west, Lakes State and Jonglei State to the north, and Eastern Equatoria State to the east. The county contains both low lying swamps and hills in the southern portion of the county. The Nile River runs down the eastern bank of Terekeka Town and Lake Madi is located in the county’s west.

Terekeka was carved out of Juba County in 2001. The main inhabitants of Terekeka county are the Mundari people. In January 2009, Terekeka became the 25th Diocese of the Episcopal Church of the Sudan. The new diocese was headed by Rt. Rev. Micah L. Dawoudi, former Assistant Bishop of Juba Diocese.

== Administration and Logistics ==
There are ten payams in Terekeka namely; Terekeka (County Headquarters), Gameiza, Nyori, Mangala North, Munia, Reggo, Rijong, Tali, Tombek, and Tindilo.

Two major roads are found in the area with the primary road running through Terekeka linking Lakes State’s Yirol to its north and Juba to its south. The roads to Yirol and Juba are accessible during the dry season, however they face “road warnings” in the rainy season.

The secondary road heading west to Mundri East County, also faces “road warnings” in both the rainy and dry season, potentially due to sporadic insecurity.

== Economy ==
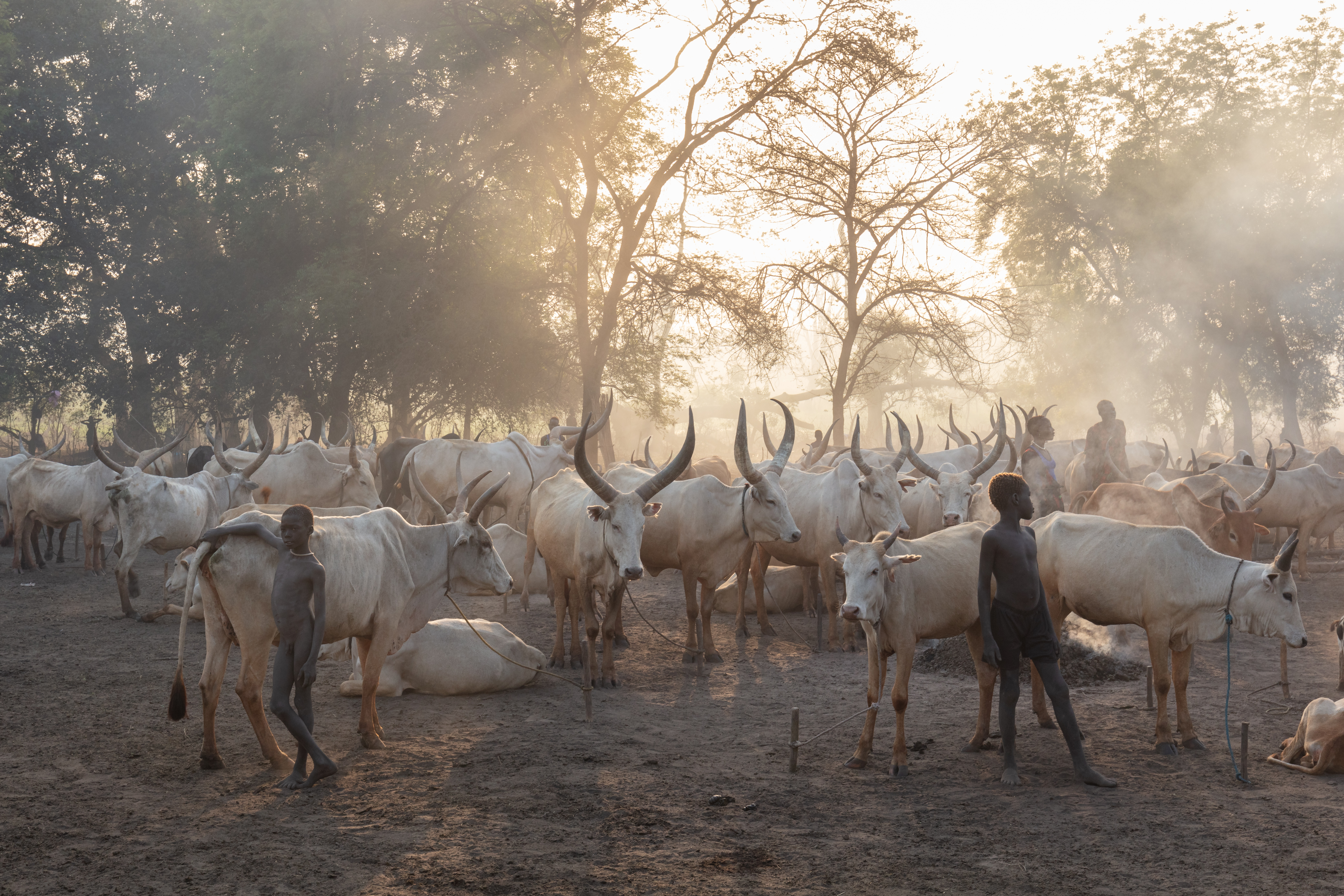
Cattle camp of the Mundari people in South Sudan

The county include low-lying swampy areas that are usually flooding but provide grazing in the dry season, and higher areas with less fertile, sandy soils. Rainfall is about 900 millimetres (35 in) annually. The people both cultivate crops and tend cattle. Cattle provide milk and represent wealth, but are neither sold nor slaughtered except in severe emergencies. The people have suffered from cattle raids by the Dinka Bor of Jonglei State and the Dinka Alyap of Lakes (state) State. The government conducted a disarmament exercise in Terekeka county in 2009, leaving the Mundari people less well armed than the Dinka and less able to defend themselves.

The people use various wild foods including green leaves, fruits and tubers, particularly during the April–May period when no other sources of food remain. Hunting for small wild game lasts from December into April. Fish are caught during the dry season (January to March) using locally manufactured spears, nets and hooks. The fish catch is normally high, and accounts for about 6% of total food.

== Infrastructure ==
As of 2005, just after the end of the Second Sudanese Civil War, most roads were poor and full of potholes and some could be used only in the dry season. Some roads were thought to contain land mines. Most of the people were considered very poor. A 2010 report showed little economic improvement in the county. Literacy levels remain under 20%, roads are in poor shape, buildings are dilapidated and there is little security. There is minimal economic development apart from farming and herding. Goods "imported" from Juba are expensive, there are no banks and no radio stations.

In 2010 6,000 children were enrolled in the 49 primary schools, which had just 52 teachers. The schools were in poor shape and extremely crowded, typically with 80 students in one room with no chairs or tables. There were two secondary schools with five teachers for 300 students.

== Conflict Dynamics ==
Terekeka’s conflict dynamics have long been marked with communal clashes. The Mundari residing in this county share proximity to Bari and Dinka groups, which has at times led to conflict over access to water and land between local armed militias, both of which are needed to sustain livelihoods related to agriculture and animal husbandry (UNICEF, 2003). Poverty, combined with high bride prices, has also encouraged cattle raiding in the area.

While there has been no major fighting between government and opposition forces in Terekeka following the outbreak of civil war in December 2013, its strategic location between along the Juba-Bor highway has made it vulnerable to movement of armed groups and associated displacement and food insecurity. For example, thousands of residents were displaced and sought refuge in the islands of the Nile River or bush around the Juba-Bor highway. Terkeka’s proximity to fighting in Jonglei has also led it to host significant IDP population from the state. The county received an estimated 9,000 IDPs, mainly from Jonglei and Upper Nile states, by May 2014, according to the county commissioner (Eye Radio, 2014).

Tension has also arisen over Terekeka’s administration and boundaries. This was related to President Kiir’s decision to split Central Equatoria State into three, as part of his move to establish 28 states in December 2015. The initiative was reportedly highly unpopular among the Mundari as they perceived it as a curb on their influence. State governors have traditionally come from the Mundari tribe, and the new borders limit the Mundari tribe to governing their own, smaller area around Terekeka. This dispute resulted in heightened tensions in the area and skirmishes between the SPLA and local armed groups (ICG, 2016). Furthermore, both newly-created Jubek and Terekeka States claimed the new Mangala County, which was eventually classified as under Jubek’s administration. In May 2016, fighting broke out between SPLA forces and what were most likely Mundari militia during the inauguration ceremony for the new county government. Approximately 1,200 people were displaced as a result of the clashes, which resulted in the deaths of three government soldiers and one civilian (Su, 2016).

Since the signing of the R-ARCISS peace agreement in 2018, the security situation in relation to the civil war has stabilized, however communal clashes continue to impact the area (REACH, 2019). In April 2019, Terekeka Town hosted a key meeting attended by the government and opposition, facilitated by UNMISS and CTSAMM, to facilitate peace mechanisms in the area (United Nations Peacekeeping, 2019).

== CLIMATE ==
The hottest month of the year in Terekeka is March, with an average high of 102°F and low of 79°F. The cool season lasts for 3.0 months, from June 12 to September 11, with an average daily high temperature below 89°F. The coldest month of the year in Terekeka is August, with an average low of 71°F and high of 87°F.
