= Alfred Futiyo Karaba =

Governor of Western Equatoria

Governor of Western Equatoria
- In office 29 June 2020 – 30 August 2025
- Preceded by: Daniel Badagbu Rimbasa (Gbudwe); Joseph Ngere Paciko (Amadi)
- Succeeded by: James Al-Tayib Jazz Birapai

Alfred Futiyo Karaba was the Governor of Western Equatoria of South Sudan. He was appointed into office by President Salva Kiir in 2020. He was the SPLA- IO Sector commandant of Western Equatoria.

Alfred Futuyo Karaba, Governor of Western Equatoria State, has promised that his government will make sure that women will obtain their 35% political representation, as stipulated in the Revitalized Peace Agreement signed in September 2018.

== Rebellion ==
In 2015 South Sudan People's Patriotic Front (SSPPF) rebel faction in Western Equatoria state unveiled its strategic objectives and for forming an alliance with other rebel groups operating in the area and in the country to remove from power the government of president Salva Kiir where Alfred Futiyo Karaba was named as the overall military commander of the forces composed mainly of the armed youth, popularly known as the Arrow Boys.
