= Makaraka =

Makaraka may refer to:

- Makaraka (people), an African ethnic group
- Mākaraka, New Zealand, a suburb of Gisborne, New Zealand
- Makaraka Racecourse, a racecourse in Mākaraka, New Zealand
