= Ezo, South Sudan =

Ezo
- Town
- Location within South Sudan
- Coordinates: 05°04′20″N 27°27′58″E
- Country: South Sudan
- Region: Equatoria
- State: Western Equatoria
- County: Ezo County

Government
  - General: Abel Sudan

Area
  - Land: 31.85 km^{2} (12.30 sq mi)
  - Metro: 8,068 km^{2} (3,115 sq mi)
- Elevation: 720 m (2,350 ft)

Population (2008)
  - Town: 55,657
  - Rank: 1
  - Metro: 80,861
  - Metro density: 13.04/km^{2} (33.8/sq mi)
- Time zone: UTC+2 (CAT)
- Postal code: 82000

Ezo is a town in Western Equatoria, South Sudan. As of 2008, the town had a population of 33,657, while Ezo County had a population of 80,861. The town is on the border with the Democratic Republic of Congo and close to the tripoint of both countries with the Central African Republic. The town is mainly populated by the Azande people.

== Transport ==
The county of Ezo has one singular airstrip, the Ezo airstrip, that was completed in 2024. The commissioner of the project states that he would like to see connections to Juba using Kush, Caravan and MAF airlines.

There is one highway connecting Ezo to the rest of South Sudan, which is the A44 highway. A dirt road goes through the Central African Republic for around 2000 feet, then crossing into the Democratic Republic of the Congo.

== Education ==
The Lissan Primary School serves all of Ezo.

== Points of Interest ==
The Bengangai Game Reserve that borders Ezo.

The Ezo County government building.

The Catholic Church of Ezo and the Anglican Church of Ezo.
