= Ayaa Benjamin Warille =

South Sudanese politician

Ayaa Benjamin Warille is a South Sudanese politician who is also the Minister of Gender, Child and Social Welfare. She was appointed into the position when the Transitional Government of National Unity was formed in February 2021

== Early life and education ==
Warille is from Mundri, she is the second-born child in her family. Her father was a journalist and politician, and her mother a nurse and medical assistant.

She graduated from University of Juba, with a Bachelor of Science in Animal Production, She later pursued postgraduate studies in the United Kingdom, obtaining a Master’s degree from the University of Aberdeen.

== Personal life ==
Warille is a widow and has one son. Her father’s political arrests during her youth influenced her outlook on governance and civil rights. Later, her husband’s abduction further shaped her decision to enter politics.

== Advocacy ==
Ayaa is also a women's rights advocate and has played several roles through the African Union Women, Gender and Youth Directorate to assist AU member states in the ratification, domestication and implementation of the Protocol to the African Charter on Human and Peoples' Rights on the Rights of Women in Africa also popularly known as the Maputo Protocol.

Ayaa Benjamin is a member of the South Sudan Women Intellectual Forum, a platform which has been campaigning for the participation and inclusion of women in government positions and decision making processes in all sectors.

She has also ensured that the 35% affirmative action as guaranteed by the Revitalized Peace Agreement on the Resolution of Conflict in South Sudan, is respected.
