= Oliver Batali Albino =

South Sudanese politician (1935–2020)

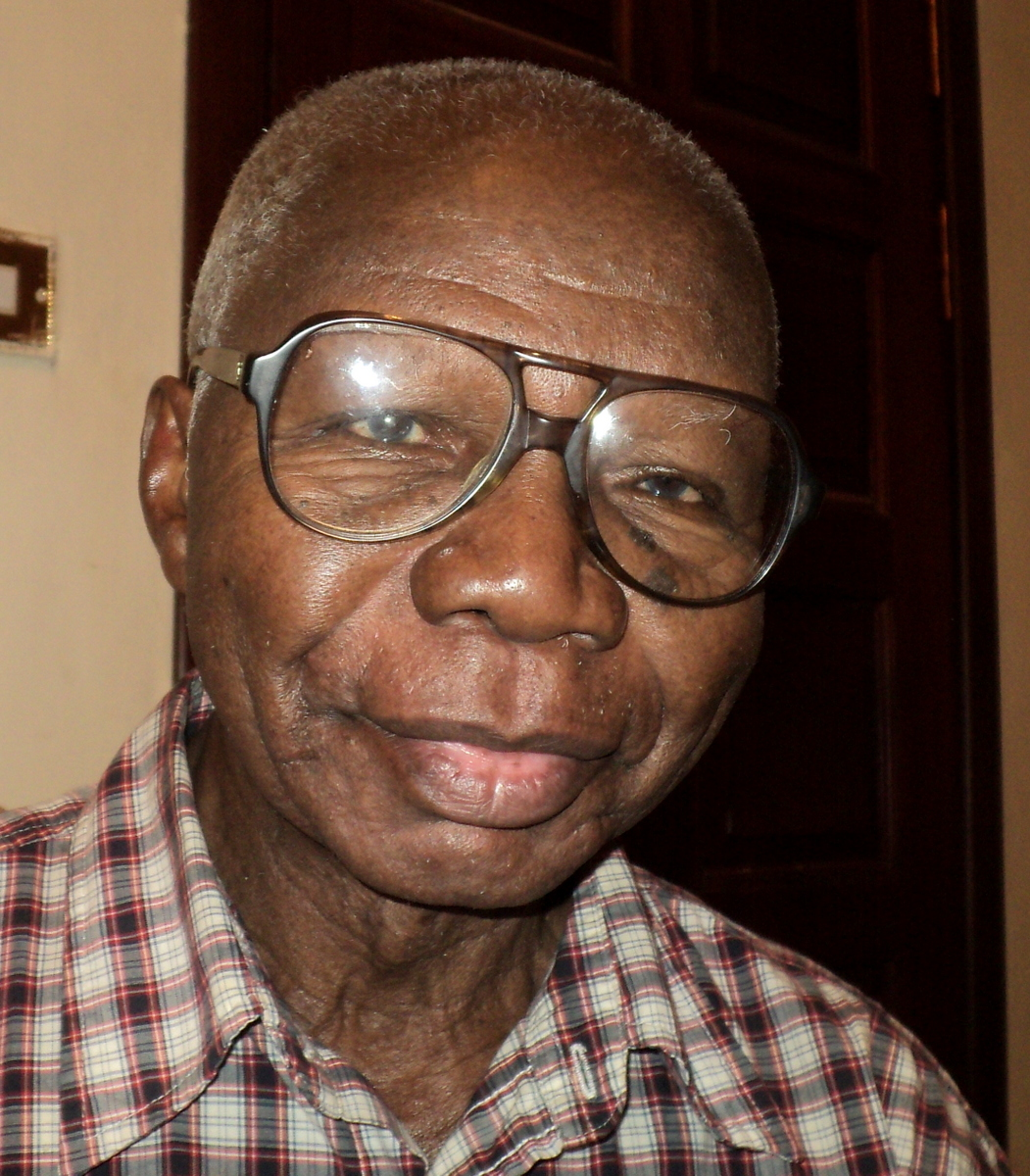
- Oliver Batali Albino in Juba in July 2011

Personal details
- Born: 11 November 1935 Yei, Yei River State, Anglo-Egyptian Sudan (present-day South Sudan)
- Died: 4 January 2020 (aged 84) Augusta, Georgia, United States
- Occupation: Politician, former civil servant

Oliver Batali Albino (11 November 1935 – 4 January 2020) was a South Sudanese politician and civil servant.

== Background ==
Oliver Albino was born on 11 November 1935 in Yei, South Sudan. He was a member of the Makaraka or Adio ethnic group in the Yei – Maridi area of Central Equatoria, closely related to the Azande ethnic group. He completed secondary school in Rumbek and studied at the University of Khartoum. In the early 1960s he went in exile and joined the Anya-Nya resistance movement in Kenya. In 1965 Oliver Albino became part of the Sudan African National Union (SANU) in Uganda. In the late 1960s and early 1970s he was a teacher at a secondary school in Gulu, northern Uganda. During that period he wrote his first book, The Sudan: a Southern Viewpoint (Oxford University Press, 1970). Oliver Albino was also a member of the Southern Sudan Liberation Movement’s delegation to the Addis Ababa peace talks of 1972. From 1975 – 1978 he was the Minister of Housing and Public Utilities in the Southern Sudan Regional Government led by Abel Alier. For only two months in 1985, April - May, Oliver Albino was the Sudanese Minister of Labour in Khartoum.

In 1996 – 1997 Oliver Albino was a fellow at the Weatherhead Center for International Affairs, Harvard University. In 2006 Oliver Albino published his second book "Democracy and power in the Sudan: How Decentralization Hurts". through AuthorHouse UK in Bloomington, USA. After the Independence of South Sudan in July 2011, Oliver Albino was appointed by President Salva Kiir as a member of the Council of States.

On 4 January 2020, Albino died in Augusta, Georgia from heart failure.
