= Tambura County =

Administrative area in Tambura State, South Sudan

- County
- Western Equatoria Counties
- Country: South Sudan
- Region: Equatoria
- State: Western Equatoria

Area
  - Total: 4,806 sq mi (12,447 km^{2})

Population (2017 estimate)
  - Total: 71,490
  - Density: 14.88/sq mi (5.744/km^{2})
- Time zone: UTC+2 (CAT)

Tambura County (spelled also as Tombura County) is an administrative area in Western Equatoria (before 22 February 2020 Tambura State), South Sudan.
