= Nzara, South Sudan =

Nzara
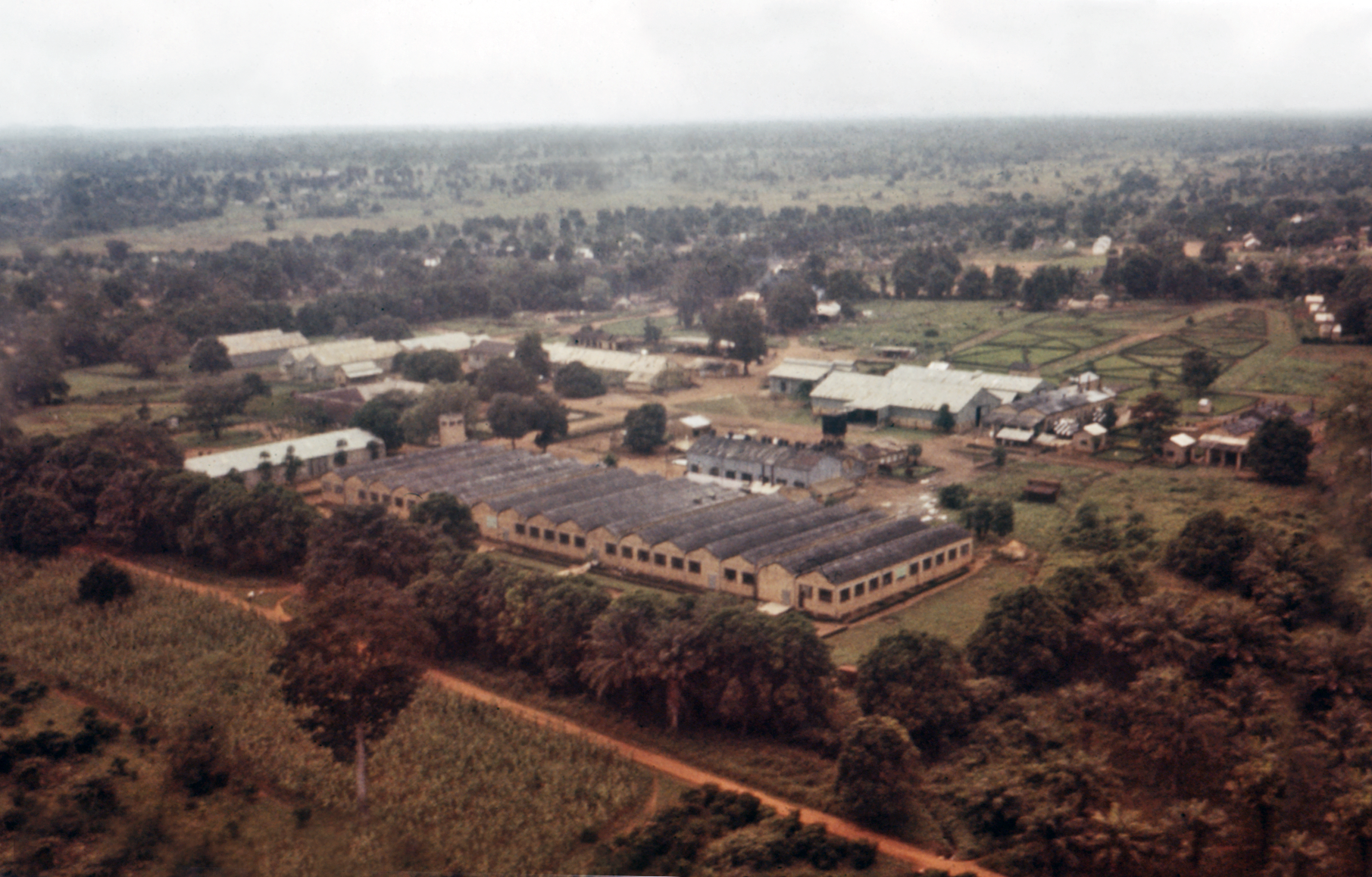
- The cotton factory in Nzara, suspected to be the source of the 1976 Ebola outbreak.

- Location in Western Equatoria State
- Coordinates: 4.647°N 28.258°E
- Country: South Sudan
- Region: Equatoria
- State: Western Equatoria
- County: Nzara County
- Time zone: UTC+2 (CAT)

Nzara is a town in Western Equatoria State, South Sudan. It lies 15 mi (24 km) to the northwest of Yambio by road, and is 25 km (15m) from the border with the DR Congo.

Nzara was the industrial center of the Azande Scheme, also known as the Equatoria Project Scheme during the Anglo-Egyptian colonial period. The Government of South Sudan has since 2006 intended to revive the agro-industrial complex.

Nzara was the site of the world's first recorded outbreak of the Ebola virus disease. In five months starting in June 1976, 151 people in the region died of the disease.

== Military base ==
Nzara served as the operational headquarters of the 4th Division of the Uganda People's Defence Force (UPDF), the Ugandan contingent in Operation Rudia II. This was part of the regional campaign military against the Lord's Resistance Army (LRA). After the LRA defeat at Camp Swahili, the UPDF ceded overall control of the operation to the Armed Forces of the Democratic Republic of the Congo (DRC) and moved the bulk of its forces to Nzara in March 2009. About 2000 UPDF troops remained in the DRC, north of Faradge, and Nzara-based attack helicopters supported them in engagements against increasingly concentrated LRA forces. When LRA Major General Caesar Acellam was captured in May 2012, he was flown from Djema in the Central African Republic to Nzara where he gave a televised interview.

According to a 2012 published report, Nzara has housed one of the four Combined Operations Fusion Centers where intelligence and operations have been coordinated among the anti-LRA coalition.
