= Kenneth Fraser (disambiguation) =

Kenneth Fraser was an Australian surgeon and soldier

Kenneth Fraser may also refer to:

- Kenneth Boyd Fraser, British virologist
- Kenneth Grant Fraser, Scottish missionary and doctor
