= Lui, South Sudan =

Lui
- Location in South Sudan
- Coordinates: 05°20′33″N 30°26′59″E
- Country: South Sudan
- Region: Equatoria
- State: Western Equatoria
- County: Mundri East County
- Time zone: UTC+2 (CAT)

Lui is a town located in Mundri East County, Western Equatoria State, South Sudan. Other nearby towns include Mundri, Amadi, Kediba, Lakamadi and Jambo (formerly known as Mideh).

The town is the headquarters of the Anglican Diocese of Lui, which originated as a Church Missionary Society Station in 1920. The diocese covers a mainly rural area of approximately 12,950 km (5,000 square miles) located just north of the equator. Central to the Diocese is the Fraser Memorial Cathedral along with a nearby Diocesan office.
