= Afikaano Monday =

Governor of Maridi State, South Sudan

Afikaano Monday is the current Governor of Maridi State, South Sudan, since 24 December 2015. He is the first governor of the state, which was created by President Salva Kiir on 2 October 2015.
