= Maridi County =

- County
- Country: South Sudan
- Region: Equatoria
- State: Western Equatoria

Area
  - Total: 2,970 sq mi (7,692 km^{2})

Population (2017 estimate)
  - Total: 106,834
  - Density: 35.97/sq mi (13.89/km^{2})
- Time zone: UTC+2 (CAT)

Maridi County is an administrative area in Western Equatoria, South Sudan. It borders Mvolo County to the north-east, Mundri West County to the east and Ibba County to the west. It also borders Lakes State (Wulu County) to the north-west, Central Equatoria State (Yei County) to the south-east and the Democratic Republic of Congo to the south-west. The major ethnic groups in Maridi County are Baka, Mundu, Avukaya, Zande, Moro Kodo, and Wetu.

== Climate of Maridi County ==
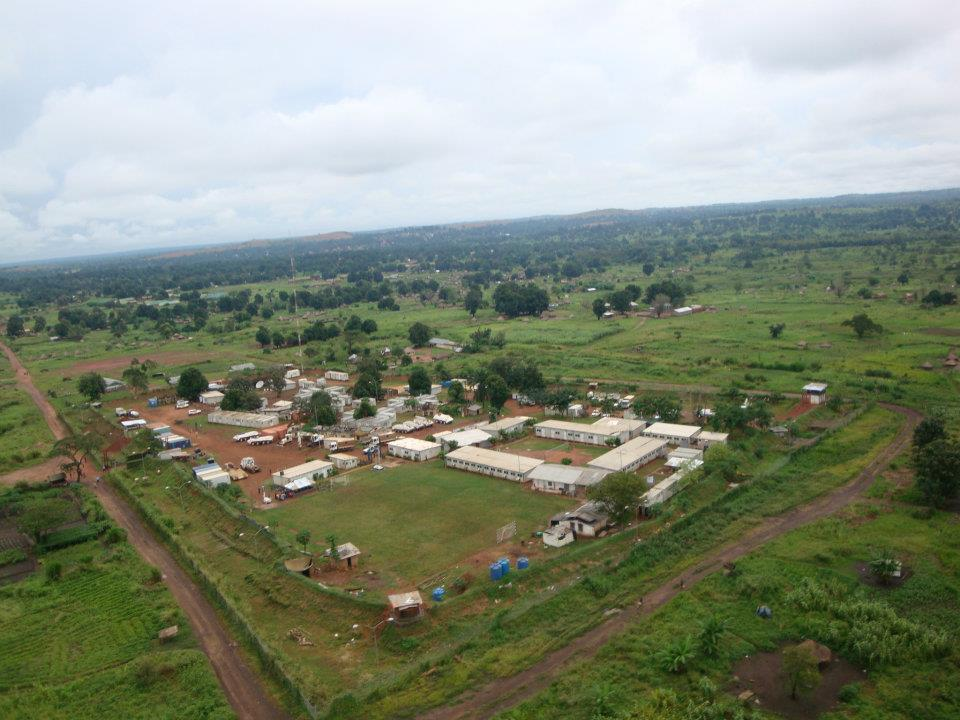
An Aerial view of UN camp in Maridi county
