= Maridi Airport =

- IATA: n/a; ICAO: HSMD

Summary
- Airport type: Public, Civilian
- Owner: Civil Aviation Authority of South Sudan
- Serves: Maridi, South Sudan
- Location: Maridi, South Sudan
- Elevation AMSL: 2,300 ft / 700 m
- Coordinates: 04°54′10″N 29°26′36″E

Map
- Location of Maridi Airport in South Sudan

Runways
Direction	Length		Surface
Direction	ft	m	Surface
	4,921	1,500	Unpaved

Maridi Airport is an airport serving Maridi in Western Equatoria, South Sudan.

== Location ==
Maridi Airport (IATA: n/a, ICAO: HSMD) is located in Maridi East County in Western Equatoria, in the town of Maridi, near the International border with the Democratic Republic of the Congo. This location lies approximately 236 kilometres (147 mi), by air, west of Juba International Airport, South Sudan's largest airport. The geographic coordinates of this airport are: 4° 54' 0.00" N, 29° 26' 24.00"E (Latitude: 4.9000; Longitude: 29.4400). Maridi Airport is situated 700 metres (2,300 ft) above sea level.

== Overview ==
Maridi Airport is a small civilian airport that serves the town of Maridi and surrounding communities. A flood in 1993 destroyed the easternmost portion of the runway. A packed dirt strip was hastily built; however, a permanent fix has not been created yet.

== See also ==
- List of airports in South Sudan
