= Peter Cirillo =

South Sudanese politician

Lt. General Peter Cerillo Swaka was a South Sudanese politician and a former commander of the Anyanya movement and governor of Equatoria region in the 1980s.

As a former prisons officer in Khartoum, Gen. Cirillo joined the Anyanya in 1965 following a pogrom of educated Southerners in the town of Yambio.

He served in various ranks and positions in the Anyanya, Sudanese Army, SPLA and also as the Governor of Greater Equatoria in then Sudan.

== His Death ==
Gen. Peter Cerillo, who is an elder brother to the National Salvation Front rebel leader, Thomas Cerilo, passed away in Nairobi Kenya in October 2019 after battling with his health for long. The late's son reported to Eye Radio that his father had been diagnosed with Diabetes (High Blood Sugar) and Hypertension (High blood pressure).
