= Amadi State =

State of South Sudan from 2015 to 2020

- State
- Location of Amadi State in South Sudan
- Country: South Sudan
- Capital: Mundri
- Number of Counties: 3

Population (2014 Estimate)
  - Total: 171,910

Amadi State was a state in South Sudan that existed between 2 October 2015 and 22 February 2020. Amadi state formed from Western Equatoria state on 2 October 2015, following a decree that established the state along with 27 other states. It was located in the Equatoria region. Amadi State bordered Eastern Lakes State, Jubek State, Maridi State, Terekeka State, Western Lakes State, Yei River State.

== History ==
Before Sudan's 10 original states split into 28 separate states, Amadi was part of Western Equatoria state. On 2 October 2015, President Salva Kiir issued a decree establishing 28 states in place of the 10 constitutionally established states. The decree established the new states largely along ethnic lines. A number of opposition parties and civil society groups challenged the constitutionality of the decree. Kiir later resolved to take it to parliament for approval as a constitutional amendment. In November, the South Sudanese parliament empowered President Kiir to create new states.

Joseph Ngere Paciko was the first and the last Governor of the state.

== Geography ==
Amadi State was located in the Equatoria region and it bordered Western Lakes to the northwest, Eastern Lakes to the northeast, Yei River to the south, Jubek to the southeast, Maridi to the west, and Terekeka to the east.

=== Administrative divisions ===
The state consisted of 3 counties. These three counties were Mundri West County, Mundri East County, and Mvolo County.

=== Cities and towns ===
The capital of the state of Amadi was the city of Mundri, South Sudan. Mundri is located in Mundri West County, with an estimated population of 20,000-30,000 in 2015. Other towns and villages in Amadi State include:

- Lui, South Sudan (also known as Nagero Lui)
- Kotobi
- Jambo
- Diko
- Karika
- Kediba
- Bari
- Bangolo
- Wandi
- Lacha
- Lanyi
- Lakamadi
- Doso
- Gulu
- Lozoa
- Kalichere
- Madiba
- Wiro.
