= Maridi Arabic =

Possible Arabic pidgin

- Region: possibly upper Nile
- Era: attested ca. 1050
- Language family: Arabic-based pidgin: Maridi Arabic

Language codes
- ISO 639-3: None (mis)
- Glottolog: None

Maridi Arabic was a possible Arabic pidgin apparently spoken in the upper Nile valley around 1000 CE. If legitimate, it would be the oldest record of a pidgin. It is known from just fifty words in an 11th-century text.

In 1068, Andalusī geographer Abū ʿUbayd al-Bakrī published the words of a traveler from Aswan, who had complained to the Caliph in Egypt that in the town of "Maridi", black Africans had "mutilated" the Arabic language.

It appears that the text may be a caricature of an actual pidgin, or at least of partially acquired Arabic. It shares several features with Juba Arabic and Nubi Creole: a complete lack of inflection, including articles, possessive markers, and agreement; a single negative marker; ʔmny for the third-person dual pronoun, and perhaps the use of jaʿal 'make' rather than colloquial qaʿad 'stay' for the progressive.

It is not known where "Maridi" was. It has been concluded that it was in Mauritania, with the single non-Arabic word in the text (below), kyk (people?), hypothesized to be from Songhai -koi 'people who' plus the Arabic plural -k. However, there are also indications that it was located in Upper Egypt or northern Sudan, as several of its features are found today only in that region. Specifically, Classical q has become ʿ (ʿayn), fwq "on" has become fwʾ, and j has become d. The last is a sound correspondence found today only in Upper Egypt.

== Text ==
The only account of the language is the following text.

by	wħd	ywm	rādwl	dwmā	lw	ʔsm.
LOC	one	day	man	Jumuʕa	to.him	name

One day there was a man whose name was Jumuʿa.

dml	lw	ʔw	w	bn	lw	ʔw.
camel	to.him	he	and	son	to.him	he

He had a camel and a son.

ʔmny	dy	rwħ	ʔʕdny	by	mħl
they.two(?)	CONT	go	stay.two(?)	LOC	place

They were going to stay in a place.

kyk	lw	ʔwl	ħrm	ʔnt	brbr.
people(?)	to.him	say	shame	you	barbarian

People(?) said to him, "Shame! You are a barbarian!

bn	nw	rwħ	ʔnt	brbr	lw	ʔʕdw
son	not	go	you	barbarian	to.him	sit/stay.him(?)

Your son should not walk, you barbarian, seat him!"

ʔmny	dml	fwʔ	ʔw
they.two(?)	camel	upon	he

They were on the camel.

kyk	lw	ʔwl	ħrm	ʔnt	brbr.
people(?)	to.him	say	shame	you	barbarian

People(?) said to him, "Shame! You are a barbarian!"

bn	ʔʕd	dwmā	rwh-.
son	sit/stay	Jumuʕa	go

The son sat and Jumuʿa walked.

kyk	lw	ʔwl	ħrm	ʔnt	brbr.
people(?)	to.him	say	shame	you	barbarian

People(?) said to him, "Shame! You are a barbarian!"

dwmā	ʔwl	kyk	mw	dyd	my	mhy.
Jumuʕa	say	people(?)	not	good	not	important

Jumuʿa said, "People(?) are neither good nor important."

== See also ==
- Varieties of Arabic
- Juba Arabic
- Nubi language
