= Mündü language =

Ubangian language spoken in Central Africa

Mündü
- Native to: South Sudan, Democratic Republic of the Congo
- Ethnicity: Mundu people
- Native speakers: (undated figure of 26,000)
- Language family: Ubangian: Sere–Mba; Ngbaka; Eastern; Mündü

Language codes
- ISO 639-3: muh
- Glottolog: mund1326

Mündü (Mondo) is a Ubangian language of South Sudan, with a few thousand speakers in the Democratic Republic of the Congo.

== Locations ==
A 2013 survey reported that ethnic Mundu reside in the following bomas of South Sudan.

- Amaki Boma, Kozi Payam, Maridi County
- E'di Boma, Ngamunde Payam, Maridi County
- Mundu Boma, Tore Payam, Yei County
- Adio Boma, Tore Payam, Yei County
