= Anzara County =

- Country: South Sudan
- State: Gbudwe State
  - Summer (DST): +3GMT

Anzara County is an administrative area in Gbudwe State, South Sudan.
