= Maridi State =

State of South Sudan from 2015 to 2020

- State
- Location of Maridi State in South Sudan
- Country: South Sudan
- Capital: Maridi
- Number of Counties: 7

Government
  - Governor: Africano Mande Gedima

Area
  - Total: 17,540 km^{2} (6,770 sq mi)

Population (2014 Estimate)
  - Total: 148,100

Maridi State was a state in South Sudan that existed between 2 October 2015 and 22 February 2020. It was formed on 2 October 2015 from Western Equatoria state. It was located in the Equatoria region. Maridi State bordered the states of Amadi State, Gbudwe State, Western Lakes State, and Yei River State.

== History ==
Before a decree in October 2015, Maridi State was part of Western Equatoria state. On 2 October 2015, President Salva Kiir issued a decree establishing 28 states in place of the 10 constitutionally established states. The decree established the new states largely along ethnic lines. A number of opposition parties and civil society groups challenged the constitutionality of the decree. Kiir later resolved to take it to parliament for approval as a constitutional amendment. In November the South Sudanese parliament empowered President Kiir to create new states.

Africano Mande was appointed as the governor of the state on 24 December 2015.

== Government of Maridi State ==
Maridi State which is regulated by a State Constitution is run by the State Government, and supported by the State Legislative Assembly and the State Legal Administration. The Governor is the head of the State of Maridi and the current Governor of Maridi State is Col. Africano Mande Gedima.

The Military, the Police, the Internal Security Bureau, the Prison Services, the Wildlife Services and the Fire Services are also present in the State and they provide services ranging from security, defence to law enforcement.

The Government of Maridi State is made up of the State Secretariat which consists of the Governor, the Deputy Governor, the Advisor for Political Affairs, the Advisor for Security, the Advisor for Peace and Reconciliation and the Secretary General. There are also seven Ministries which are: State Minister of Local Government and Law Enforcement, State Minister of Information, Culture, Youth and Sports, State Minister of Finance and Public Services, State Minister of Agriculture, Forestry and Fisheries, State Minister of Physical Infrastructure, State Minister of Education, Gender and Social Welfare, and the State Minister of Health and Environment There are other support State Institutions which are: Maridi State Revenue Authority, Maridi State Investment Authority, Maridi State Municipal Council, Maridi State Training and Research Institute, and Maridi State Tourism Board.

The overall vision which the Government of Maridi State aims to achieve and as a matter of policy that the State Government aims to pursue is the realization of a peaceful, secured, healthy, skillful, productive, informed, cultured and ultimately economically prospered Maridi State with good accessibilities and whose populations are availed access to social services and opportunities to become innovative and progressive.

== People ==
According to the national population census of 2009, the overall population of Maridi State is estimated to be 148,000 and Maridi State is a home to seven (7) ethnic groups which are Baka, Moru-Kodo, Mundu, Avukaya, Zanda, Wa’di and Wetu.

A 2013 survey had reported a majority of Baka people, with minorities of Avukaya, Azande, Moro (Moru), and Mundu people.

== Geography ==
Maridi State covers an estimated land size of 17,540 km^{2}, bigger than some countries in the world with an altitude of 964.3 meters (3,164 feet), being the highest and 727.9 meters (2,388 feet), being the lowest. Maridi State is bigger in size than Tuvalu, a country in the South Pacific with an estimated size of 26 km² and a population of 11,204 as of 2021 World Bank report. Maridi State is also bigger than Vanuatu, another country in the South Pacific with a size of about 12,189 Km²as per the World Bank report of 2021.

Maridi also covers a long borderline with the Democratic Republic of Congo. Maridi State is located in the Equatoria region, and it borders Western Lakes to the north, Yei River to the southeast, Gbudwe to the west, and Amadi to the east.

=== Administrative divisions ===
Maridi state consists of seven counties. The seven counties are Landili, Maridi, Kozi, Mambe, Ibba, Nabanga and Maruko Counties. Each county was also given a commissioner.

=== Towns and cities ===
The capital of Maridi State is the city of Maridi, South Sudan. Other towns and villages in the state include Ibba. Their total combined population of Maridi State is estimated to be 148,000 in 2008.
