= Joseph Bakosoro =

South Sudanese politician

Governor of Western Equatoria
- In office 26 May 2010 – August 2015
- Preceded by: Jemma Nunu Kumba
- Succeeded by: Patrick Raphael Zamoi

Personal details
- Ethnicity: Zande

Joseph Bakosoro also known as Bangasi Joseph Bakosoro is a South Sudanese politician. He is the current Minister of public service in Central Equatoria, Juba. He served as governor of Western Equatoria after winning an election over Jemma Nunu Kumba, serving from 26 May 2010 to August 2015, at which time he was arrested by security officials of South Sudan for suspicions to his being linked with the Arrow Boys, an armed local defense force originally formed in Uganda to protect local communities from attacks by the Lord's Resistance Army, later released on April 27, 2016.

He rejoined SPLM on 15 July 2021 and currently he is the Minister of Public Service of the Republic of South Sudan, Central Equatoria State Juba.

== Sanctions ==
Bakosoro was dismissed by the presidential decree in August 2015. He was removed as governor of Western Equatoria State in August 2015 together with the governor of Central Equatoria Clement Wani, Governor of Warrap Nyadeng Malek and Governor of Upper Nile Simon Kun Poch.

== Personal life ==
He belongs to Zande of Kowe clan.
