= Martin Willoughby Parr =

British colonial administrator

Martin Parr CBE
- Born: 22 November 1892
- Died: 15 June 1985 (aged 92)
- Education: Winchester College and Brasenose College, Oxford
- Occupations: British colonial governor and Alderman of the London County Council
- Known for: Governor of the Upper Nile and Equatoria, Sudan
- Political party: Conservative
- Parent(s): Rev Willoughby Chase Parr and Laura Parr, daughter of Col. Francklyn
- Awards: CBE

Martin Willoughby Parr CBE (22 November 1892 – 15 June 1985), CBE (1944, OBE 1929), was a governor of the British-administered province of Equatoria in Anglo-Egyptian Sudan.

== Early life ==
Martin Parr was the son of the Rev. Willoughby Chase Parr and Laura, daughter of Colonel Francklyn of Speen Hill Lodge, Newbury. His maternal grandmother was Jane Francklyn, daughter of Sir Samuel Cunard, baronet. His brother Jack was a master at Winchester College. He was educated at Winchester College (Scholar) and Brasenose College, Oxford (Scholar) where he read Greats. He played Rugby football for Oxford University 1913–14, and had a half-blue for rifle shooting, 1913–14.

== Career ==
Parr was commissioned in the Highland Light Infantry at the start of the World War I in 1914 and served in France 1914–15 and in Palestine 1917–18, returning to France in 1918. He lost an eye during the Battle of Neuve Chapelle.

In 1919 Parr joined the Sudan Political Service and became Private Secretary to the Governor-General, 1927–33 and Deputy Civil Secretary, 1933–34. He was Governor of the Upper Nile, 1934–36; and Governor of Equatoria, 1936–42. He retired from the Sudan in 1942 and lived the rest of his life in London.

== Later life ==
Parr was vice-president of the National Association of Boys Clubs, working particularly with the Crown & Manor boys' club in Hoxton. His obituary in The Times mentions "an early tendency to compare the Hoxton boys with his beloved Dinka tribesmen, initially somewhat to the disadvantage of the former". He was also on the Foundation Committee of the Gordon Boys' School, Woking (now called Gordon's School).

He was a prominent member of the congregation of the Temple Church, Vice President of the British and Foreign Bible Society, and Vice President of the Church Missionary Society. He was an Alderman of the London County Council (Conservative) 1954–61. He died unmarried.
