= Tumbura =

- Town
- Location in South Sudan
- Coordinates: 05°35′24″N 27°28′12″E
- Country: South Sudan
- Region: Equatoria
- State: Western Equatoria
- County: Tambura County
- Elevation: 2,230 ft (680 m)

Population (2010 estimate)
  - Total: 9,500
- Time zone: UTC+2 (CAT)

Tumbura, sometimes spelled Tambora or Tambura, is a town in South Sudan.

== Location ==
The town is located in Tambura County, Western Equatoria, in the western part of South Sudan, near the International borders with the Democratic Republic of the Congo (DRC) and with the Central African Republic (CAR). This location lies approximately 582 kilometres (362 mi), by road, northwest of Juba the capital and largest city in South Sudan.

== Overview ==
Tumbura is a small town close to the country's western border with DRC and CAR. The area around Tumbura has witnessed the ravages of the Lord's Resistance Army (LRA) who have terrorized civilians in this area along with neighbouring populations in DRC and CAR since 2008.

== Population ==
In 2010, the population of the town of Tumbura was estimated at 9,500.

== Transport ==
The major road south (A44) leads to Li Yubu, South Sudan, at the border with the Central African Republic. A44-North leads to Wau, South Sudan. Two smaller roads lead out of town towards the east and west of Tumburaa. The town is also served by Tumbura Airport.

== See also ==
- Tumbura Airport
- Western Equatoria
- Equatoria
