= Nagero County =

- County
- Country: South Sudan
- State: Western Equatoria
- Seat: Nagero

Population (2017 estimate)
  - Total: 12,852

Nagero County is one of the 10 counties of Western Equatoria, a state of South Sudan

== Geography ==
Nagero County is one of the ten (10) Counties that constitute Western Equatoria State, it was established in the mid of 2004 by a decree of late Dr. John Garang de Mabior. Nagero County came into existence as the result of the fulfillment of the vision of our arch hero Dr. John Garang De Mabior of taking town to the people which embraces Decentralized system of Government and is clearly stipulated in the local government act 2009. The District of Tambura was divided to realize this vision that is why Ezo and Nagero were crowned as counties to enable easy service delivery to the people; initially, Nagero and Ezo were all Payams under Tambura administration. Nagero county is located far north of the State Headquarters about 285 km, it borders Western Bahr El Ghazal State in the North, Tambura County in the South, Warrap State in the East, and the Republic of Central Africa in the West. Nagero County comprises three Payams, Namely, Nagero Central Payam, Duma Payam, and Namatina Payam. In the 2012 population projection mapping, Nagero County population was estimated at 74,585.

The county is inhabited by three tribes, the Balanda (Balanda viri and Balanda Boor), Azande and the Bongo; these ethnic groups have lived together for centuries, intermarried, and adopted some common cultural heritage that gives them concrete coexistence. These communities depend on subsistence farming for their livelihood as they supplement this by lulu and honey harvest and fishing for domestic consumption. The county is endowed with flora and fauna which are potentially source of income for the county, and has good physical features that are very significant for the establishment and growth of the tourism industry.

Nagero County like the rest of other counties in South Sudan has suffered the devastating effects of the two decades of civil war that claimed many lives of people and sent many more others to the refuge and internally displaced camps. The aftermath of war can clearly be seen in Nagero County. There are many widows and orphans, and single-parent families in society. There are sheer inadequate health services, and illiteracy levels are alarming with high rates of school dropouts.
