= Patrick Raphael =

South Sudanese politician

Patrick Raphael is a South Sudanese politician. He was the first Governor of the now defunct Gbudwe State, South Sudan. which was created by President Salva Kiir on 2 October 2015.
