= Arrow Boys =

South Sudanese militia group

The Arrow Boys are a militia operating in the Western Equatoria region of South Sudan. The militia sprung up as a self-defense unit who get their name from their use of traditional weapons like bows and arrows which are supposedly treated with poison.

== Lord's Resistance Army rebellion ==
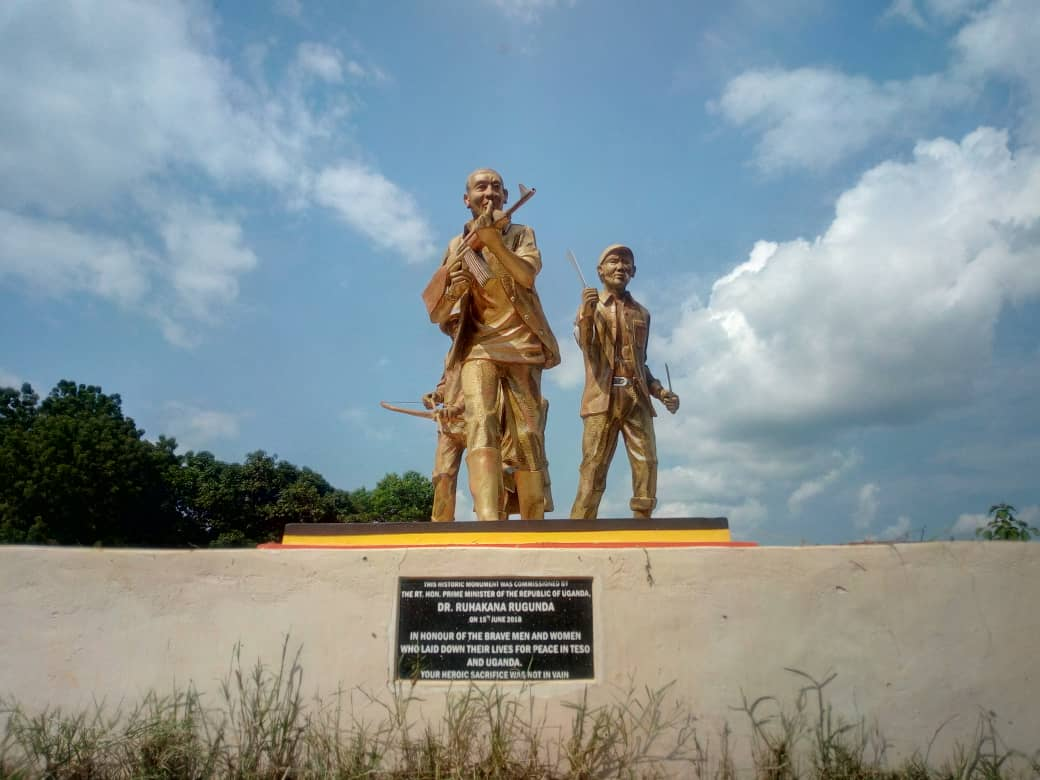
The Arrow Boys Monument honoring Ugandan members of the militia who were killed during the Lord's Resistance Army insurgency

During the insurgency by the Lord's Resistance Army (LRA) in Uganda, the Arrow Boys were formed in Teso in the Eastern Region as a self-defense militia. As the Lord's Resistance Army fled Uganda into South Sudan, the militia spread there as well in order to defend against the LRA. Although Arrow boys activity died down after 2011 when the threat of LRA reduced.

== South Sudanese Civil War ==
During The South Sudanese civil war in 2015 Arrow Boys began remobilizing. Remobilization was caused by increased threats to Azande farmland by Dinka cattle herders, increased SPLA troop presence in Equatorial and the arrest of Western equatorial governor Joseph Bakosoro in September of 2015. Arrow Boys leader Alfred Futiyo Karaba declared allegiance to SPLM-IO and he was given the title of major general of the SPLA-IO. Arrow Boys where integrated to SPLM-IO coalition and they were renamed to "SPLA-IO Sector 6", although they continued to be referred as Arrow Boys. In December 2015 the Group claimed to occupying parts of Western Equatoria.

== See also ==
- South Sudan
