= Henry Galbraith =

Irish Anglican priest

Henry Galbraith was an Irish Anglican priest:

Galbraith was born in County Galway and educated at Trinity College, Dublin. Galbraith was ordained in 1851. After curacies in Loughgall and Dublin he held incumbencies at Rathdrum and Powerscourt. He was Archdeacon of Glendalough from 1888 until 1905.
