= Ibba County =

Ibba Ibba County
- County
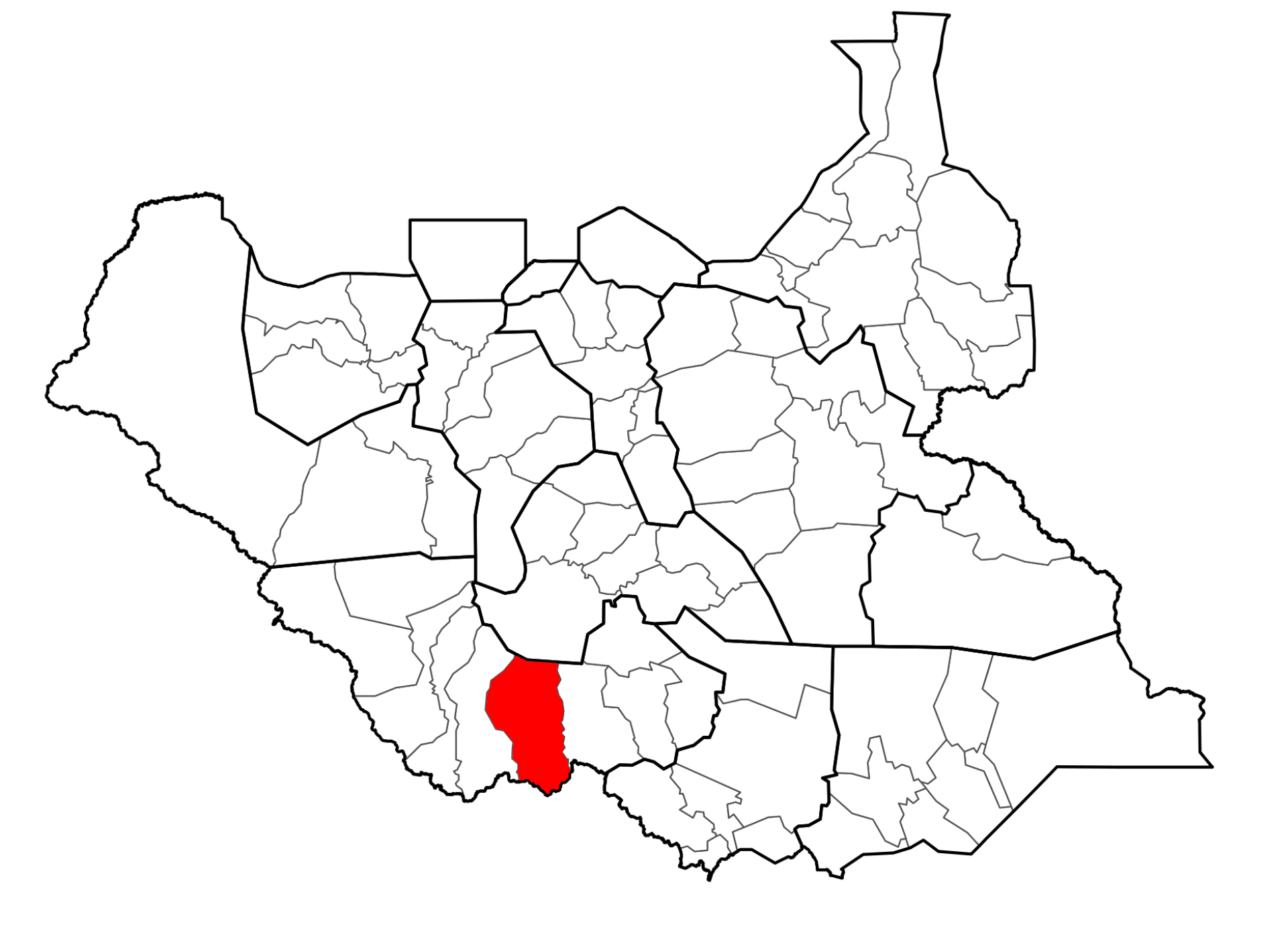
- Location in South Sudan
- Country: South Sudan
- State: Western Equatoria State

Area
  - Total: 3,712 sq mi (9,613 km^{2})

Population (2017 estimate)
  - Total: 54,622
  - Density: 14.72/sq mi (5.682/km^{2})
  - Ethnicities: Azande and Baka
  - Religions: Christianity and African Traditional Religion
- Time zone: UTC+2 (CAT)

Ibba County is one of 10 county administrative area in Western Equatoria State, South Sudan.
