= Tore Payam =

Payam in Yei River County

Tore is an administrative area and one of the four Payams of Yei River County, Central Equatoria State, South Sudan. its located in the west of Yei and is the biggest town in the region and serves as the Administrative headquarter of Yei River It's located 48 miles maridi road with four boma of mundu, Baka, avokaya and Adio boma

== Climate Change ==
Tore Payam is an administrative division in Central Equatoria State, South Sudan. Its territory includes traditional lands of the Avokaya, Baka, Mundu, Adio, and Ajugo peoples.
