= Baka language (South Sudan) =

Central Sudanic language of South Sudan

Baka
- Native to: South Sudan, Democratic Republic of the Congo
- Native speakers: 60,000 (2017)
- Language family: Nilo-Saharan?: Central Sudanic; Bongo–Bagirmi; Bongo–Baka; Baka

Language codes
- ISO 639-3: bdh
- Glottolog: baka1274

Baka (Tara Baka) is a Central Sudanic language of South Sudan, with the majority living in an area centered on Maridi, South Sudan, but also a couple thousand speakers in the DRC. It has consonants with trilled release such as /dr/ and /ɡ͡bʙ/.

A 2013 survey reported that the Baka were the largest ethnic group in Maridi County, South Sudan. They also live in Baka Boma, Tore Payam, Yei County, South Sudan.

== Phonology ==
=== Consonants ===
		Labial	Alveolar	Alveopalatal	Velar	Labiovelar
Stop	voiceless	p	t	c	k	kp
Stop	voiced	b	d		g	gb
Stop	prenasalized	mb	nd		ŋg	ŋmgb
Stop	implosive	ɓ	ɗ	'y		
Nasal		m	n	ɲ	ŋ	
Trill	voiceless			tr		kʙ̥
Trill	voiced	ʙ		dr		gʙ
Trill	prenasalized			ndr		ŋmgʙ
Fricative	voiceless	f	s			
Fricative	voiced	v	z			
Fricative	prenasalized	nv	nz			
Flap		ⱱ̟	r	ř		
Lateral			l			
Semivowel		w		y		

=== Vowels ===
(-ATR)
	Front	Central	Back
High	ʟ		ʊ
Low	ɞ	a	ɔ

Neutral vowel: ɨ

(+ATR)
	Front	Central	Back
High	i		u
Low	e	ə	o
