= Mvolo County =

- County
- Country: South Sudan
- State: Western Equatoria State

Government
  - Type: Local Government
  - Commissioner: Hon. Ruben Amai

Area
  - Total: 2,210 sq mi (5,725 km^{2})

Population (2017 estimate)
  - Total: 62,655
  - Density: 28.35/sq mi (10.94/km^{2})
  - Ethnicities: Jur Mödö
  - Religions: Christianity (100% Anglicans)
- Time zone: UTC+2 (CAT)

Mvolo County is an administrative area in Western Equatoria State, South Sudan.
