= Wulu County =

- County
- Country: South Sudan
- State: Lakes State

Area
  - Total: 4,576 sq mi (11,852 km^{2})

Population (2017 estimate)
  - Total: 61,084
  - Density: 13.349/sq mi (5.1539/km^{2})
- Time zone: UTC+2 (CAT)

Wulu County is an administrative area (county) located in Lakes State, South Sudan. In August 2016, the former larger Wulu County had split to create a newer smaller Wulu County and Barghel County.
