= Jur Modo language =

Central Sudanic language of South Sudan

Jur Modo
- Native to: South Sudan
- Ethnicity: Jur Modo
- Native speakers: 180,000 (2017)
- Language family: Nilo-Saharan?: Central Sudanic; Bongo–Bagirmi; Bongo–Baka; Jur Modo

Language codes
- ISO 639-3: bex
- Glottolog: jurm1239

Jur Modo, also known as Jur or Modo, is a Central Sudanic language spoken by the Jur Modo people of South Sudan. Dialects are Lori, Modo (Jur Modo, Modo Lali), Wira, Wetu. It is a tonal language.

== Phonology ==
=== Vowels ===
	Front	Central	Back
Close	i /ɪ/, ï /i/		u /u/, o /ʊ/
Mid	e /ɛ/, ë /e/	ö /ɵ/	ɔ /ɔ/
Open		a /a/	

=== Consonants ===
		Labial	Alveolar	Palatal	Velar	Labial-velar	Glottal
Nasal		m /m/	n /n/	ny /ɲ/	ŋ /ŋ/	ŋm /ŋ͡m/	
Plosive	prenasal	mb /m͡b/	nd /n͡d/	nj /ɲ͡ɟ/	ŋg /ŋ͡ɡ/	ŋb /ŋ͡b/	
Plosive	voiced	b /b/	d /d/	j /ɟ/	g /ɡ/	gb /ɡ͡b/	
Plosive	voiceless	p /p/	t /t/	c /c/	k /k/	kp /k͡p/	ʾ /ʔ/
Plosive	implosive	ʾb /ɓ/	ʾd /ɗ/	ʾj /ʄ/			
Fricative	prenasal		nz /n͡z/				
Fricative	voiced	(v /v/)	z /z/				
Fricative	voiceless	f /f/	s /s/				h /h/
Rhotic			r /r/				
Lateral			l /l/				
Semivowel		w /w/		y /j/			
