= Balanda Boor people =

Balanda Boor Ethnicity

The Balanda Boor (or Boor) are an ethnic group numbering people living in the South Sudanese states of Western Equatoria and Western Bahr el Ghazal. They speak the Belanda Bor language, however most are bilingual in Belanda Viri.
