= Ezo County =

Town of Ezo Ezo County
- County
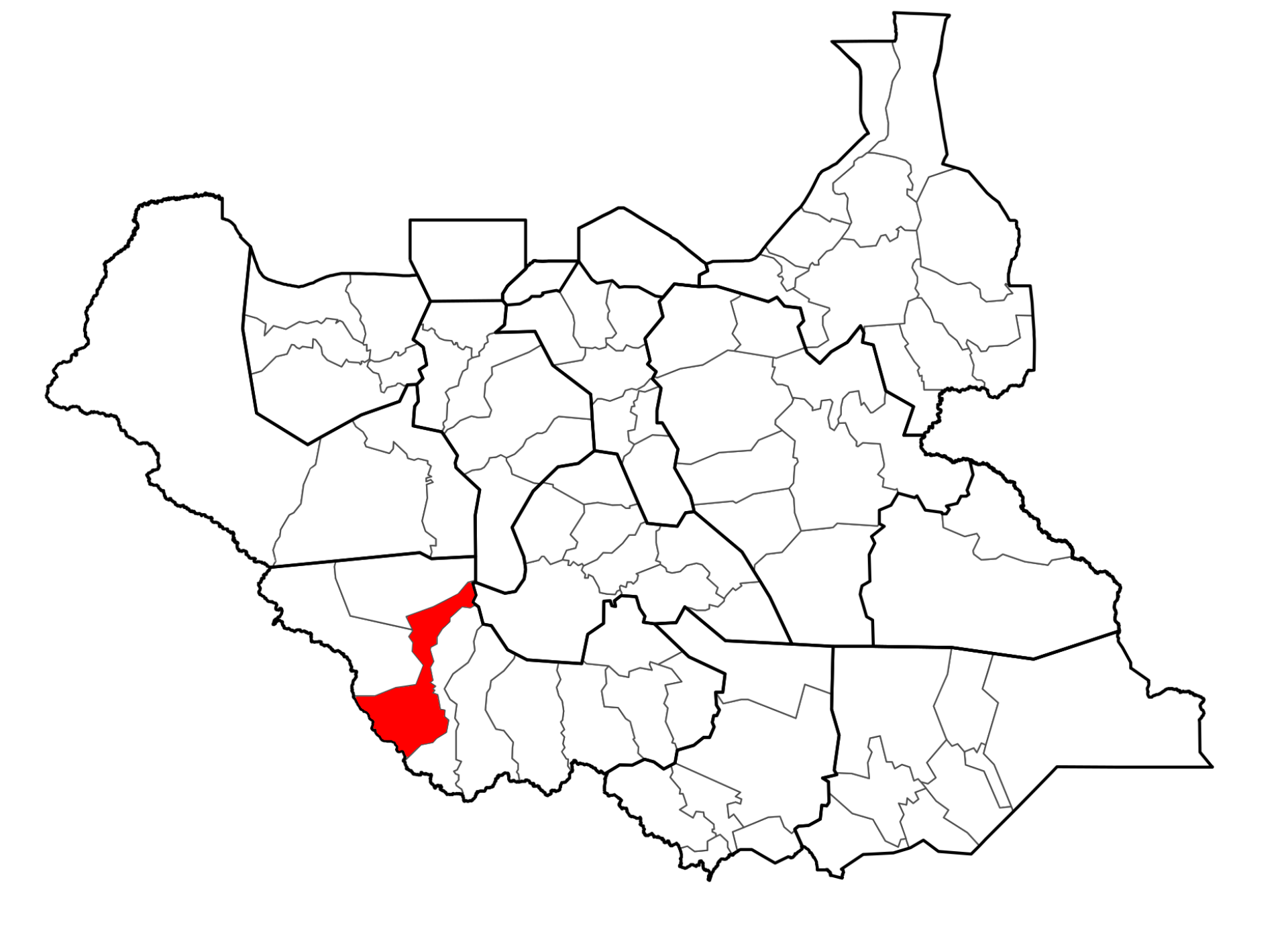
- Location in South Sudan
- Country: South Sudan
- Region: Equatoria
- State: Western Equatoria

Area
  - Total: 3,115 sq mi (8,068 km^{2})

Population (2017 estimate)
  - Total: 105,228
  - Density: 33.78/sq mi (13.04/km^{2})
  - Ethnicities: Azande
  - Religions: Christianity
- Time zone: UTC+2 (CAT)

Ezo County is an administrative area in Western Equatoria State, South Sudan.
