= Mundri East County =

- County
- Country: South Sudan
- Region: Equatoria
- State: Western Equatoria

Area
  - Total: 1,961 sq mi (5,079 km^{2})

Population (2017 estimate)
  - Total: 62,655
  - Density: 31.95/sq mi (12.34/km^{2})
- Time zone: UTC+2 (CAT)

Mundri East County is an administrative area in Western Equatoria, South Sudan.
