= Yambio County =

- County
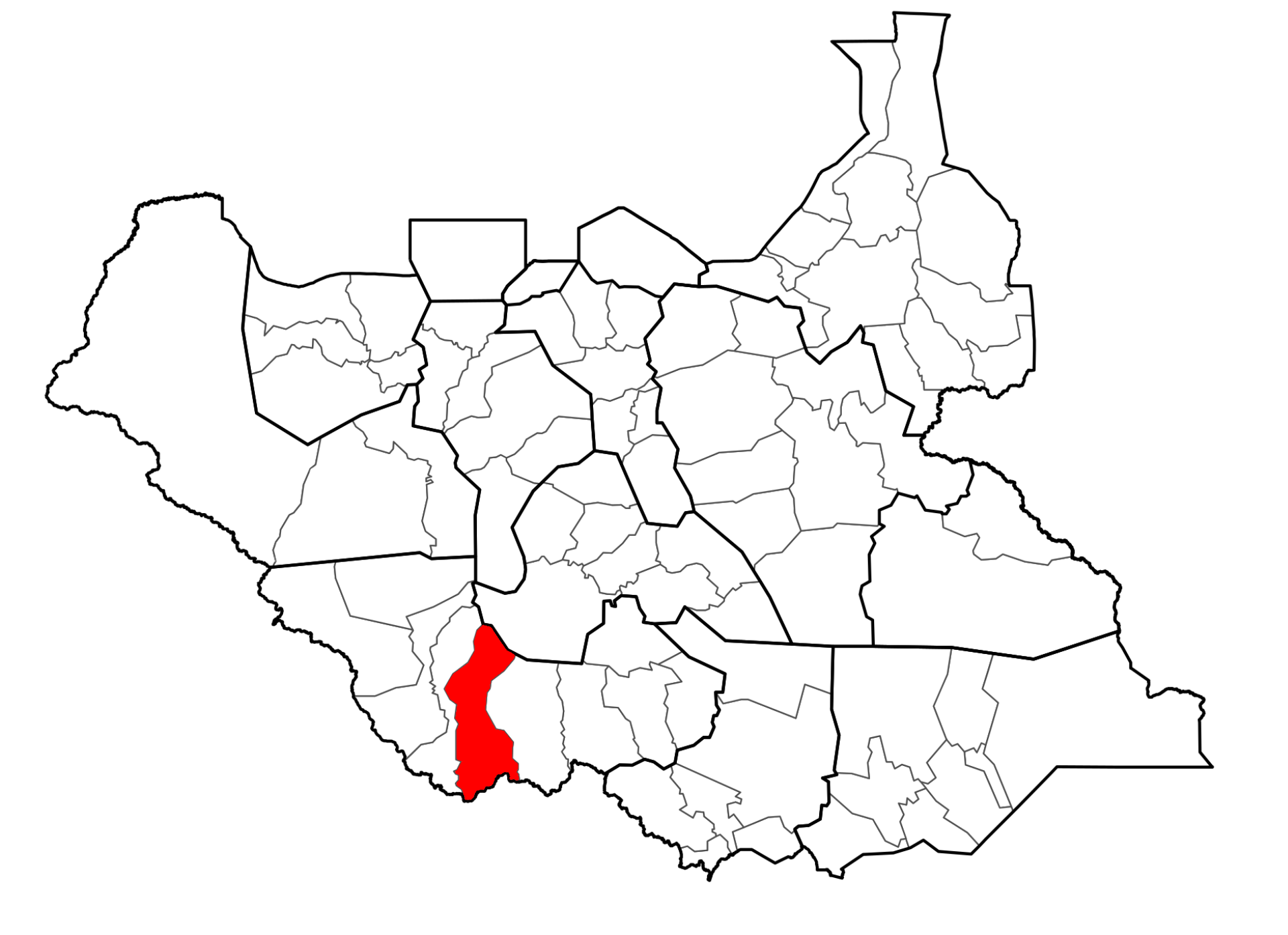
- Location in South Sudan
- Country: South Sudan
- State: Western Equatoria State

Area
  - Total: 3,395 sq mi (8,792 km^{2})

Population (2017 estimate)
  - Total: 197,603
  - Density: 58.21/sq mi (22.48/km^{2})
- Time zone: UTC+2 (CAT)

Yambio County is an administrative county of Western Equatoria State, South Sudan.
