= Adio people =

Ethnic group indigenous to Central Africa

Adio
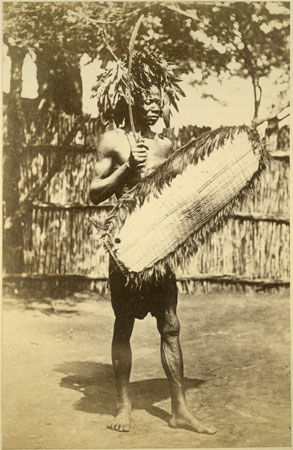
- Portrait of a Zande (Makaraka) warrior, c. 1877

Regions with significant populations
- South Sudan

Languages
- Kakwa, Mundu

Religion
- Christianity; traditional African religions

Related ethnic groups
- Azande, Kakwa, Mundu

The Adio (also called Iddio or Makaraka) are an ethnic group indigenous to Central Africa, closely related to the powerful Azande or NiamNiam, occupying the Bahr-el-Ghazal west of Lado. They came originally from the country of the Kibas, north of the Welle River.

Currently, they form part of the population of the South Sudanese state of Central Equatoria. The Adio speak Kakwa and Mundu.
