= Maridi =

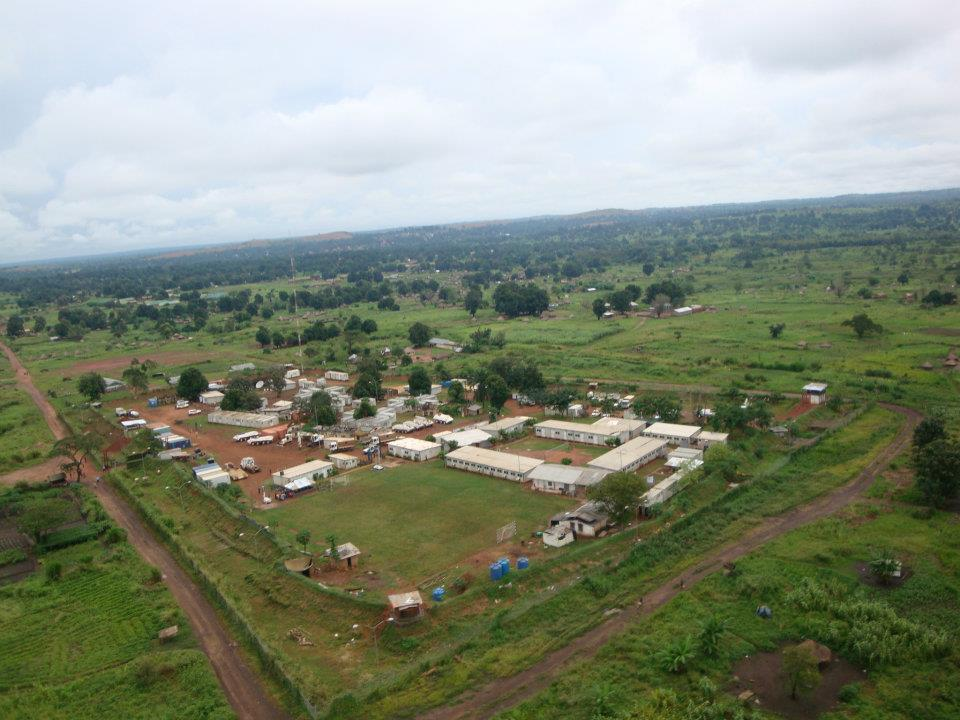
- United Nations camp at Maridi

- Location in South Sudan
- Coordinates: 04°54′36″N 29°27′00″E
- Country: South Sudan
- Region: Equatoria
- State: Western Equatoria
- County: Maridi County
- Elevation: 2,300 ft (700 m)

Population (2026)
  - Total: 136,759
- Time zone: UTC+3 (EAT)

Maridi is a town in Maridi County, Western Equatoria, South Sudan. The town is located near the Democratic Republic of the Congo–South Sudan border.

== Overview ==
Maridi has been a regional centre of government since colonial times. It is also reputed to be a centre of education in South Sudan. Yambio is the state capital of Western Equatoria State, which is 140 km from Maridi. Khazana Lake is a picnic spot which is often visited by NGO and UN staff. The county remains green during the rainy season with Mango trees full of fruits. The habitat has a diverse fauna, most common of them being the baboons, deer and the black mamba.

== Population ==
In 2026, according to the World Population Review, the population of Maridi was 136,759.

== Transport ==
The town is served by Maridi Airport, known to be the largest airport in Western Equatoria. The airport sits at an elevation of 700 metres (2,300 ft), above sea level. It has a single unpaved runway, the dimensions of which are not publicly known at this time. Roads (murram base dirt roads) to and from Maridi have been reconditioned and are quite good.

== History ==
Maridi given its geostrategic position is rich in history dating back to the pre-colonial era where the Baka tribe used it as a hub for settlement, agriculture production and hunting. The British colonial expedition also used it as a military, religious and anthropological hub. Anthropologist E. E. Evans-Pritchard spent a significant time in Maridi studying the behavioral patterns of the Baka people. Mr. Pritchard collected many Baka cultural artifacts, some of which are kept to date in Pitt Rivers Museum in Oxford.

During the post-colonial era, the north Sudanese merchants and military occupied the area where they traded in coffee, fruits, timber and minerals. After almost 50 years of north Sudanese occupation and rule, the Sudan People Liberation Movement/Army, dislodged the north Sudanese military in March 1991. That marked a new era for Maridi and it subsequently became part of the newly independent South Sudan in July 2011.

In September 2015, an oil tanker exploded on a road about 20 km from Maridi, at Bahir Naam Payam, killing over 170 people. The truck had gone off the road and overturned. People were approaching the truck in order to siphon petrol from it when it exploded. Injured were taken to Maridi Civil Hospital and Olo Primary Health Clinic in Mambe Payam, according to Radio Tamazuj. In 2015, Maridi became a State with Col. Africano Mande as its first Governor. Maridi State thus became divided into seven Counties of Maridi, Ibba, Kozi, Landili, Mambe, Nabanga and Moruko. The first flag of Maridi State was hoisted in June 2016

== See also ==
- Maridi Arabic
- Maridi Airport
- Western Equatoria
- Equatoria
