= Tambura State =

State of South Sudan from 2017 to 2020

Tambura
- State
- Country: South Sudan
- Region: Equatoria
- Number of counties: 2
- Capital: Tambura
- Time zone: UTC+3 (EAT)

Tambura was a state in South Sudan. It was created in January 2017 and abolished on 22 February 2020.
