= Mundu people =

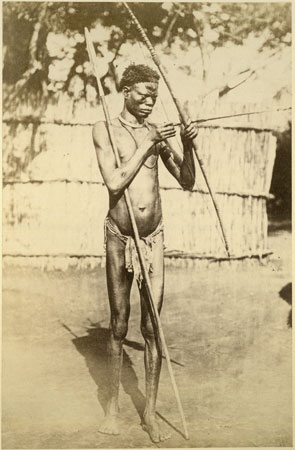
Mundu man with bow and arrow as well as spear, late 1870s southern Sudan

Mundu is an ethnic group in Western Equatoria and in Central Equatoria in South Sudan. Its population in Sudan is about 50,000 to 60,000. They speak Mündü, a Ubangian language.
