= Equatoria =

Coordinates: 4°52′N 31°35′E

- Region
- Motto: God Is Our Strength
- Location in South Sudan
- Country: South Sudan
- Region: Equatoria
- Province of Anglo-Egyptian Sudan: 1870
- Capital: Juba

Area
  - Total: 195,847.67 km^{2} (75,617.21 sq mi)

Population (2014 estimate)
  - Total: 3,399,400
  - Density: 17.357/km^{2} (44.955/sq mi)
- Time zone: UTC+2 (CAT)
- Area code: 211

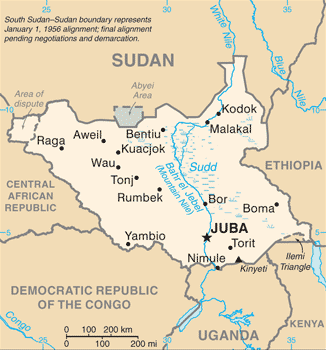
Towns in the region.

Equatoria is the southernmost region of South Sudan, along the upper reaches of the White Nile and the border between South Sudan, Uganda, Kenya, and the Democratic Republic of the Congo. Juba, the national capital and the largest city in South Sudan, is located in Equatoria. Originally a province of Anglo-Egyptian Sudan, it also contained most of northern parts of present-day Uganda, including Lake Albert and West Nile. It was an idealistic effort to create a model state in the interior of Africa that never consisted of more than a handful of adventurers and soldiers in isolated outposts.

Equatoria was established by Samuel Baker in 1870. Charles George Gordon took over as governor in 1874, followed by Emin Pasha in 1878. The Mahdist Revolt put an end to Equatoria as an Egyptian outpost in 1889. Later British Governors included Martin Willoughby Parr. Important towns in Equatoria included Lado, Gondokoro, Dufile and Wadelai. The last two former areas of Equatoria, Lake Albert and West Nile are now situated in Uganda.

Under Anglo-Egyptian rule, most of Equatoria became one of the eight original provinces of Sudan. The region of Bahr el Ghazal was split from Equatoria in 1948. In 1976, Equatoria was further split into the provinces of East and West Equatoria. The region has been troubled with violence during both the First and Second Sudanese Civil Wars, as well as the anti-Ugandan insurgencies based in Sudan such as the Lord's Resistance Army and West Nile Bank Front.

== Geography ==
=== Administrative divisions ===
Equatoria consists of the following states:

- Central Equatoria
- Eastern Equatoria
- Western Equatoria

Between October 2015 and February 2020, Equatoria consisted of the following states:

- Amadi State
- Gbudwe State
- Maridi State
- Tambura State
- Imatong State
- Torit State
- Kapoeta State
- Jubek State
- Terekeka State
- Yei River State

== People ==
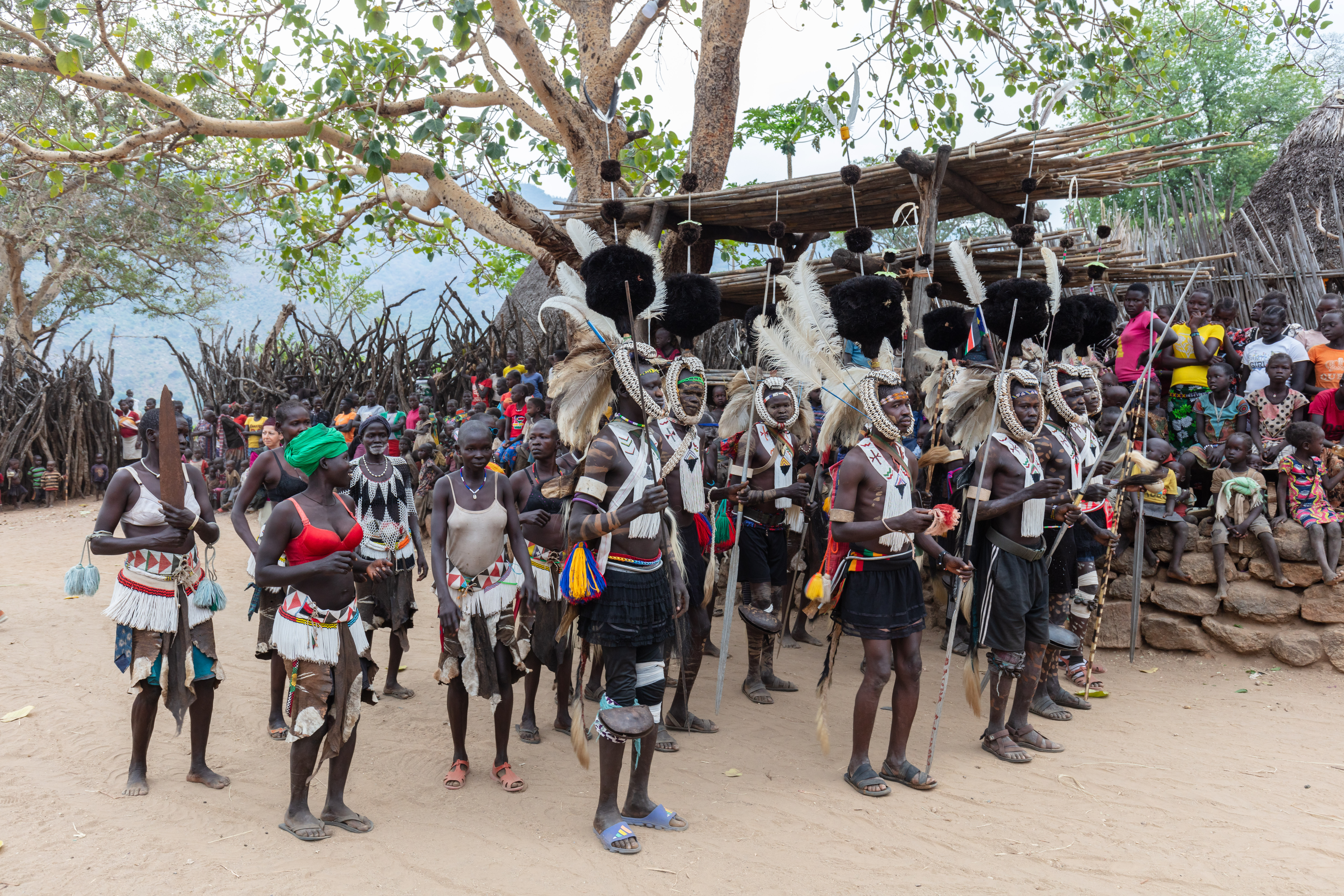
Lopit people in Eastern Equatoria

The people of Equatoria are traditionally peasants or nomads belonging to numerous ethnic groups. They live in the counties of Budi, Ezo, Juba, Kajo-keji, Kapoeta, Magwi, Maridi, Lainya, Mundri, Terekeka, Tombura, Torit, Yambio, and Yei. Equatoria is inhabited by the ethnolinguistic groups listed below. The following tribes occupy the three states of Greater Equatoria: Acholi, Avukaya, Baka, Balanda, Bari, Didinga, Kakwa, Keliko, Kuku, Lango, Lokoya, Narim, Lopit, Lugbwara, Lulubo, Madi, Makaraka or Adio, Moru, Mundari, Mundu, Nyangwara, Otuho, Pari, Pojulu, Tenet, Toposa and Azande. Some of these tribes like Bari, Pojulu, Kuku, Kakwa, Mundari and Nyangwara share a common language, but their accents, and some adjectives and nouns do vary; the same applies to Keliko, Moru and Madi.

== Languages ==
Other than Arabic or (Arabi Juba) and English, the following languages are spoken in Equatoria according to Ethnologue.

- Nilotic languages
  - Eastern
    - Acholi language
    - Lango language
    - Lokoya language
    - Lopit language
    - Otuho language
    - Toposa language
- Surmic languages
  - Didinga language
  - Kacipo-Balesi language
  - Narim language
  - Tennet language
    - Päri language
  - Western
    - Bari language
    - Balanda Bongo language
    - Mundari language
    - Dongotono language
    - Jur language
    - Kakwa language

- Moru-Madi languages
  - Ma’di language
  - Beli language
  - Keliko language
  - Moru language
  - Lugbara language
  - Olu’bo language
- Bongo-Bagirmi languages
  - Jur Modo language
  - Mo’da language
  - Morokodo language
  - Nyamusa-Molo language
- Adamawa–Ubangi languages a branch of the Bantu family
  - Makaraka or Adio language
  - Zande language
  - Avukaya language
  - Baka Language
  - Boguru language
  - Ndogo language

== Culture ==
Due to many years of civil war, the Equatorian culture is heavily influenced by the countries neighboring Equatoria and hosting Equatorians. Many Equatorians fled to Ethiopia, Kenya, Uganda, the Democratic Republic of the Congo, the Central African Republic, Sudan, the United States, Canada, the United Kingdom, Australia and Europe, where they interacted with the nationals and learnt their languages and culture. For most of those who remained in the country, or went North to Sudan and Egypt, they greatly assimilated Arabic culture.

Most Equatorians kept the core of their culture even while in exile and diaspora. Traditionally, culture is highly upheld and a great focus is given to knowing one's origin and dialect. Although the common languages spoken in Equatoria are Juba Arabic/Arabi Juba and English, Lingala and Kiswahili are being introduced to the population to improve the country's relations with its East African neighbors. Many musicians from Equatoria use English, Lingala, Kiswahili, Arabi Juba (Arabic Creole), their language or dialect or a mix of all. Popular artists sing Afro-beat, R&B, and zouk. Dynamiq is popular for his reggae.

== History ==
=== Early history ===
In the 19th century, Egypt controlled Sudan and established the Equatoria province to further control its interests over the Nile. The Egyptian authorities selected British explorer Sir Samuel Baker to establish Equatoria for them, which he did in 1870. Baker was instructed to establish trading posts along the White Nile and Gondokoro (Gondu kuru, means "difficult to dig", in Bari), a trading center located on the east bank of the White Nile in Southern Sudan. Gondokoro was an important center since it was located within a few kilometres from the cutoff point of navigability of the Nile from Khartoum. It is presently located near the city of Juba in Equatoria.

Baker's attempt to create additional trading posts and control Equatoria was unsuccessful because villages surrounding Gondokoro were frequently bypassed by Arab invaders who wanted to impose their culture and way of life on the people. King Gbudwe who ruled the western part of Equatoria at the time as The King of Azande Kingdom despised the Arab culture and way of life and encouraged the tribes to resist the invaders and protect their African culture and their way of life. The invaders were met with stiff resistance from Equatorian tribes such as the Azande, Bari, Lokoya, Otuho, and Pari.

At the end of Baker's service as governor, British general Charles George Gordon was appointed governor of Sudan. Gordon took over in 1874 and administered the region until 1876. He was more successful in creating additional trading posts in the area. In 1876, Gordon's views clashed with those of the Egyptian governor of Khartoum forcing him to go back to London.

In 1878 Gordon was succeeded by the Chief Medical Officer of the Equatoria province, Mehemet Emin, popularly known as Emin Pasha. Emin made his headquarters at Lado (now in South Sudan). Emin Pasha had little influence over the area because the Khartoum governor was uninterested in his development proposals for the Equatoria region.

In 1881, Muhammad Ahmad Abdullah, a Muslim religious leader, proclaimed himself the Mahdi ("expected one") and began a holy war to unify the tribes of Western and Central Sudan, including Equatoria. By 1883 the Mahdists had cut off outside communications. However, Emin Pasha managed to request assistance from Britain via Buganda. The British sent the explorer Henry Morton Stanley and who led a relief expedition, called the "Advance," in February 1887 to rescue Emin. The Advance navigated up the Congo River and then through the Ituri Forest, one of the most difficult forest routes in Africa, resulting in the loss of two-thirds of the expedition's personnel. While the Advance succeeded in reaching Emin Pasha by February of the following year, the Mahdists had already overrun the bulk of the province, and Emin had already been deposed as governor by his officers in August 1887. The Advance reached the coast, with Emin, by the end of the year, by which point the Mahdists were firmly in control of Equatoria.

In 1898, the Mahdist State was overthrown by the Anglo-Egyptian force led by British Field Marshal Lord Kitchener. Sudan was proclaimed a condominium under British-Egyptian administration with Equatoria being administered by the British.

=== British policy ===
Equatoria received little attention from the British prior to World War I. Equatoria was closed to outside influences and developed along indigenous lines. As a result, the region remained isolated and underdeveloped. Limited social services to the region were provided by Christian missionaries who opened schools and medical clinics. The education provided by the missionaries was mainly limited to learning English language and arithmetic.

=== Sudanese independence ===
In February 1953, the United Kingdom and Egypt reached an agreement providing for Sudanese self-government and self-determination. On January 1, 1956 Sudan gained independence from the British and Egyptian governments. The new state was under the control of the Arab led Khartoum government. The Arab Khartoum government had promised Southerners full participation in the political system, however, after independence the Khartoum government reneged on its promises. Southerners were denied participation in free elections and marginalized from political power. The government actions created resentment in the south that led to a mutiny by a group of Equatorians sparking the 21 year civil war (1955–1972 and 1983–2004).

=== Equatoria Corps ===
The states of Equatoria (green)

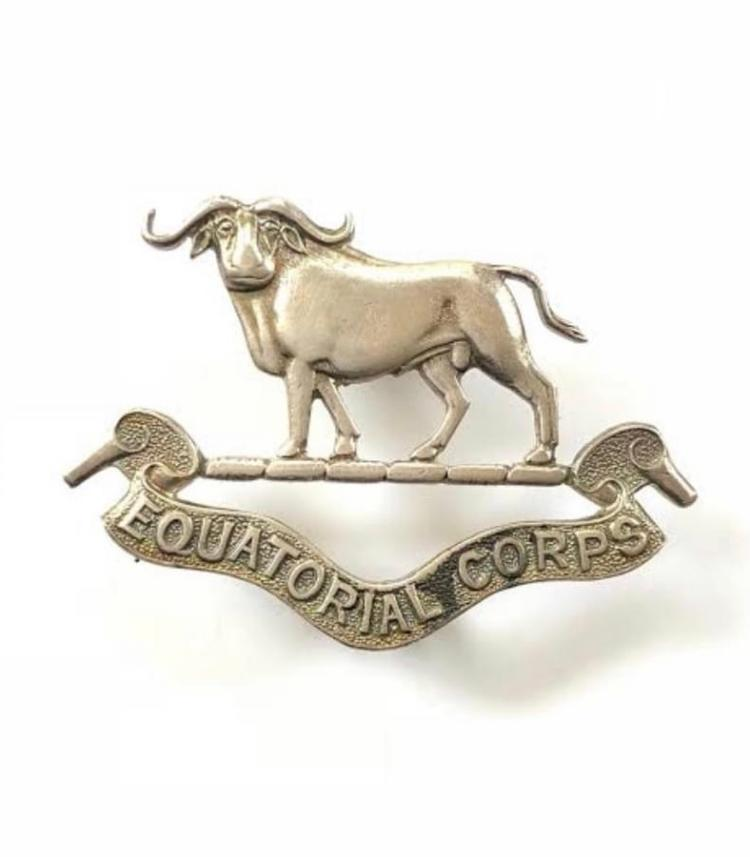

Equatorians played an instrumental role in the struggle for autonomy in South Sudan. The origins of Sudan's civil war dates back to 1955, a year before independence, when it became clear the Arabs were going to take over the national government in Khartoum. Equatoria gave its name to the southernmost unit of the British Sudan Defence Force, formed during the Anglo-Egyptian administration. This was the Equatoria or Southern Corps.

On August 18, 1955, No. 2 Company of the Equatoria Corps mutinied at Torit, Eastern Equatoria. No. 2 Company had been ordered to make ready to move to the north, but instead of obeying, the troops mutinied, along with other Southern soldiers across the south in Juba, Yei, Yambio, and Maridi. The Khartoum government sent other Sudan Defence Force units to quell the rebellion and many mutineers of the Equatoria Corps went into hiding rather than surrender. This marked the beginning of the first civil war in southern Sudan. The rebellion that emerged from the Equatoria Corps was later called Anya Nya and the leaders were separatists, who demanded the creation of a separate South Sudanese nation, free from Arab domination. The Equatorian leaders of the Anya Nya and founders of the struggle included Saturnino Ohure, Aggrey Jaden, Ezboni Mondiri, and Benjamin Lwoki.

The Khartoum government sent its forces to arrest the rebels and capture anyone who supported their cause. By the early 1960s civilians believed to be Anya Nya sympathizers were arrested and shipped to Kodok concentration camp where they were tortured and killed. Some of the first detainees and survivors of the horrific torture at Kodok include Emmanuel Lukudu and Philip Lomodong Lako.

By 1969 the Equatorian rebels found support among foreign governments and were able to obtained weapons and supplies. Anya Nya recruits were trained in Israel where they also got some of their weapons. The Anya Nya rebels received financial assistance from Southern Sudanese and Southern exiles from the Middle East, Western Europe, and North America. By the late 1960s, the war had resulted in the deaths of half a million people and several hundred thousand southerners escaped to hide in the forests or to refugee camps in neighboring countries.

Anya Nya controlled the southern countryside while the government forces controlled the major towns in the region. The Anya Nya rebels were small in number and scattered all over the region making their operations ineffective. It is estimated that there were between 5,000 and 10,000 Anya Nya rebels.

On May 25, 1969, Colonel Gaafar Muhammed Nimeiri led a military coup and overthrew General Ibrahim Abboud's regime. In 1971 Joseph Lagu, from the Madi ethnic group, became the leader of the southern forces opposed to Khartoum government and founded the South Sudan Liberation Movement (SSLM). Anya Nya leaders united and rallied behind Lagu. Lagu was also supported by exiled southern politicians. With Lagu's leadership the SSLM created a governing infrastructure throughout many areas in southern Sudan. In 1972 Nimeri held negotiations with the Anya Nya at Addis Ababa, Ethiopia. At the talks the Anya Nya demanded a separate southern government and an army to defend the south. Ethiopia's Emperor Haile Selassie moderated the talks and helped the two sides reach an agreement. The result was the Addis Ababa Agreement. The agreement granted autonomy for the South with three provinces: Equatoria, Bar al Ghazal and Upper Nile. The south would have a regional president appointed by the national president to oversee all aspects of government in the region. The national government would maintain authority over defense, foreign affairs, currency, and finance, and economic and social planning, and interregional concerns. The members of the Anya Nya would be incorporated into the Sudanese army and have equal status with the northern forces. The agreement declared Arabic as Sudan's official language and English as the south's principal language for administration and schooling. Despite opposition from SSLM leaders on the terms of the Agreement, Joseph Lagu approved the agreement and both sides agreed to a cease-fire. The Addis Ababa Accords were signed on March 27, 1972 and the Sudanese celebrated that day as National Unity Day. This agreement resulted in a hiatus in the Sudanese civil war from 1972 to 1983.

=== Recent history ===
In 1983, President Gaafar Nimeiry abolished the parliament and embarked on a campaign to Islamize all of Sudan. He outlawed political parties and enacted Sharia law in the penal code. Non-Muslim southerners were now forced to obey Islamic laws and traditions. The policies revived southern opposition and military insurgency in the South. In 1985 Abdel Rahman Swar al-Dahab led a coup and overthrew the regime. In 1986, Sadiq al-Mahdi was elected president of Sudan. The new regime began negotiations led by Colonel John Garang de Mabior, the leader of the Sala, but failed to reach an agreement to end the southern insurgency. Civil war has continued since then, but international pressure led SPLA and the Khartoum government to reach an agreement to end the 21-year civil war.

In January 2020, the National Alliance for Democracy and Freedom Action (NADAFA) sought to join talks in Rome seeking to resolve political rifts within South Sudan. The group is a coalition of holdout political groups including the People’s Democratic Movement (PDM), which was not signatory to the peace agreement signed by President Salva Kiir’s South Sudanese government in 2018. NADAFA sought a power-sharing arrangement in the new national government, with "People’s Constitutional Conventions" held in Equatoria, Upper Nile and Bahr al Ghazal. In September 2020, Sudans Post published a message from Dr. Hakim Dario, the leader of NADAFA, expressing concern that the new nation had been named "South Sudan" and proposed that the nation should be called "Equatoria Federal Republic".

On February 9, 2022, the Azande community in Yambio held a coronation ceremony for King Atoroba Peni Rikito Gbudue. The traditional royal title was last held by King Rikito's great-grandfather King Gbudue, who died in 1905. Some neighboring cultural groups such as the Maridi and Balanda people wrote letters to the new king, warning him that they would not be subjects to the restored kingdom, with the Maridi letter specifically rejecting any ethnic political divisions, saying "We stand to promote the Republic of South Sudan, not the culture of a specific group.” However, Badagbu Daniel Rimbasa, the king's brother, stated that the new king will not participate in politics. “It’s purely promotion of our culture and its preservation and heritage, not political.”

== Notable Equatorians ==
- Samuel Baker, 1st Governor of Equatoria 1870–1874
- Charles Gordon, 2nd Governor of Equatoria 1874–1876
- King Gbudwe, Azande King 1800s–1905
- King Atoroba Peni Rikito Gbudue, Azande King since February 9, 2022
- Saturnino Ohure, allegedly fired the first shot in the First Sudanese Civil War
- Joseph Oduho
- Joseph Lagu
- Joseph James Tombura
- Aggrey Jaden
- Peter Cirillo
- Oliver Batali Albino
- Samson L. Kwaje
- Cirino Hiteng Ofuho
- Beatrice Wani-Noah
- Elias Taban, Bishop, founder of the Evangelical Presbyterian Church of Sudan
