= Mundri West County =

- County
- Country: South Sudan
- State: Western Equatoria

Area
  - Total: 2,270 sq mi (5,878 km^{2})

Population (2017 estimate)
  - Total: 44,179
  - Density: 19.47/sq mi (7.516/km^{2})
- Time zone: UTC+2 (CAT)

Mundri West County is a small administrative area in Western Equatoria, South Sudan.
