= Western Equatoria =

State of South Sudan

- State
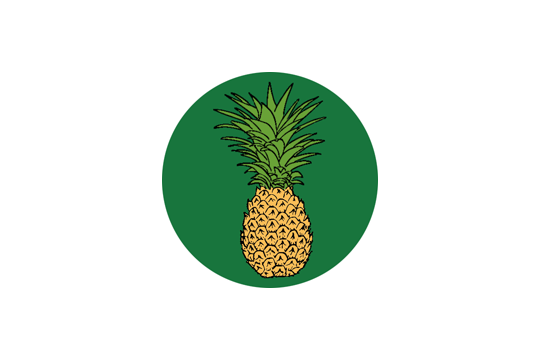
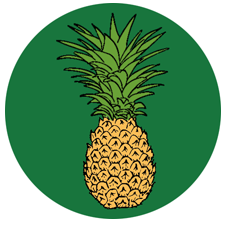
- Flag Seal
- Nickname: The Green State
- Motto: State Under God's Control
- Location in South-West of South Sudan.
- Coordinates: 05°19′N 28°24′E
- Country: South Sudan
- Region: Equatoria
- No. of counties: 10
- Province/State: 1976/1995
- Capital: Yambio

Government
  - Type: Autocracy System
  - Governor: Badagbu Daniel Rimbasa

Area
  - Total: 79,342.66 km^{2} (30,634.37 sq mi)

Population (2017 estimate)
  - Total: 803,263
  - Density: 10.1240/km^{2} (26.2210/sq mi)
- Time zone: UTC+2 (CAT)
- Area code: 211
- HDI (2019): 0.430 low · 2nd of 10

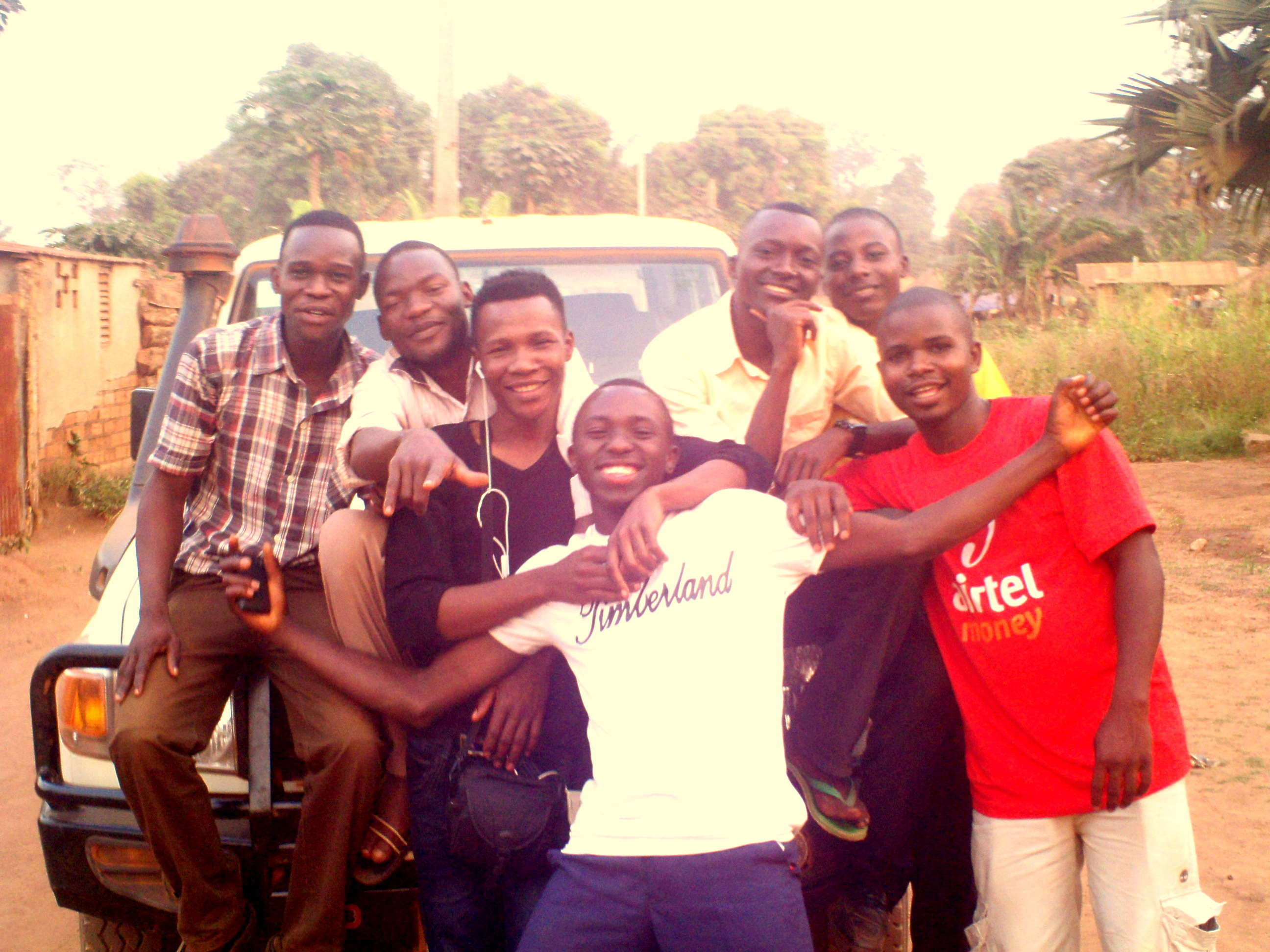
Youth of Yambio

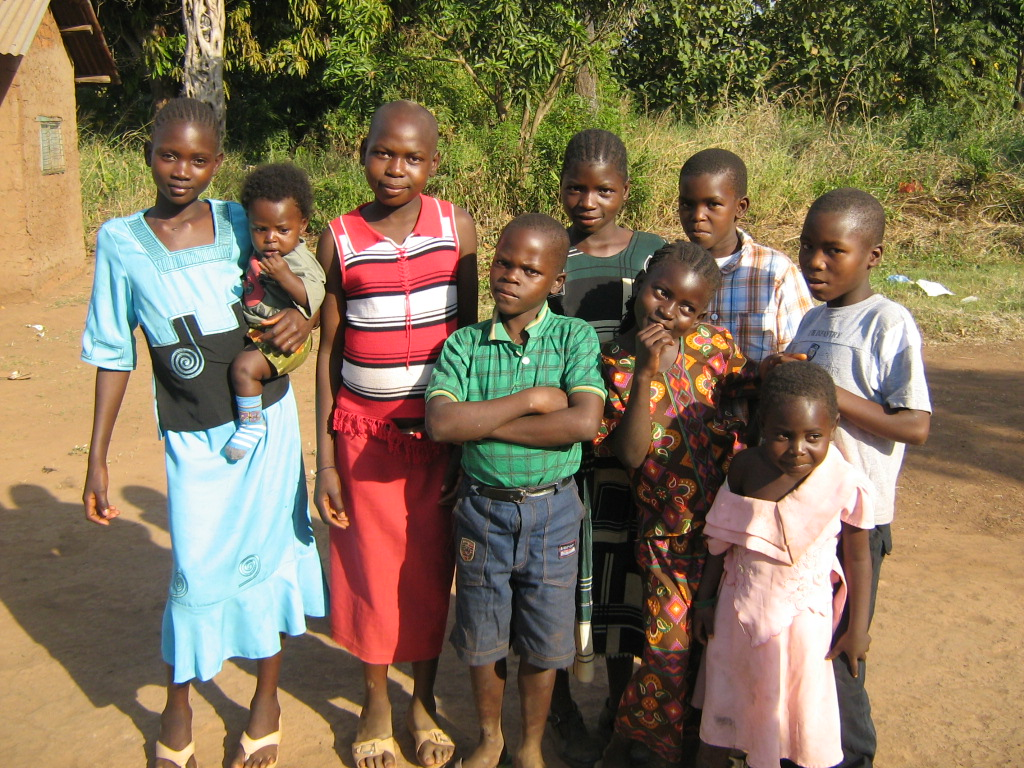
Children in Yambio, Western Equatoria, South Sudan

Western Equatoria is a state in South Sudan. It has an area of 79,343 square kilometres (30,635 sq mi). The state capital is Yambio. The state was divided into counties, each headed by a County Commissioner.

Western Equatoria seceded from Sudan as part of the Republic of South Sudan on 9 July 1956. On October 2, 2011, the state was divided into Amadi, Maridi, and Gbudwe states, and Tambura State was split from Gbudwe State on 14 January 2015. Western Equatoria was re-established by a peace agreement signed on 22 February 2020.

== History ==
Since the 16th century, Western Equatoria has been a home to the Avokaya, Azande, Baka, Moru, Mundu, and Balanda.

The Mahdist Revolt of the 1880s destabilized the nascent province, and Equatoria ceased to exist as an Egyptian outpost in 1889. Important settlements in Equatoria included Lado, Gondokoro, Dufile, and Wadelai. European colonial maneuverings in the region came to a head in 1898, when the Fashoda Incident occurred at present-day Kodok; Britain and France almost went to war over the region. In 1947, British hopes to join South Sudan with Uganda, while leaving Western Equatoria as part of Belgian Congo, were dashed by the Juba Conference to unify North and South Sudan.

In the middle of the twentieth century, after Sudan's independence in 1956, Western Equatorians sacrificed their lives for over 5 decades in movements for the independence of South Sudan. This includes the Anya Nya led by Joseph Lagu and the Sudan People's Liberation Army/Movement (SPLA/M), led by John Garang de Mabior, as they envisioned New Sudan. Western Equatoria was also known as the breadbasket state for liberators during both civil wars.

Western Equatoria was separated from its sister state of Eastern Equatoria, becoming a province in 1976. The two were rejoined in 1983 before being split again in 1996; this time, it was split into the current three-state division of Western Equatoria, Central Equatoria, and Eastern Equatoria. The Comprehensive Peace Agreement in 2005, which preceded the 2011 South Sudanese independence referendum, confirmed the division of the Equatoria region into the three states of Western, Central, and Eastern Equatoria.

=== Post-independence ===
Western Equatoria was the site of simmering conflict during the South Sudanese Civil War, although significant fighting did not break out there until after the 2015 Agreement on the Resolution of the Conflict in South Sudan (ARCSS). The ARCSS did not fully specify the role that the former anti-government armed forces would play in the post-ARCSS South Sudanese government. As a result, competing groups with varying levels of opposition to the government moved into Western Equatoria and used it as an opposition stronghold. This led to severe humanitarian consequences, as local civilians were collectively punished when government troops regained control of an area. The armed opposition was led by the Arrow Boys and their successors; the Arrow Boys had been founded as a primarily Azande-led militia protecting the area from the Lord's Resistance Army of Joseph Kony.

The process of stabilizing Western Equatoria (and the larger Equatoria region) is ongoing, with conferences organized within the state to "foster sustainable peace" by "address[ing] the root causes of intercommunal tensions". Armed groups continue to operate within Western Equatoria as of August 2026. Throughout the 2020s, the politics of Western Equatoria have become ethnically divided, and tensions between the national government and the opposition governor of Western Equatoria have manifested with competing government and opposition armed forces patrolling parts of the state.

== Counties ==
There are 10 counties in Western Equatoria:

- Yambio County Capital: Yambio
- Nzara County Capital: Nzara
- Ibba County Capital: Ibba
- Ezo County Capital: Ezo
- Maridi County Capital: Maridi
- Tombura County Capital: Tombura
- Mundri West County Capital: Mundri
- Mvolo County Capital: Mvolo
- Nagero County Capital: Nagero
- Mundri East County Capital: Kedi'ba

Other important towns in Western Equatoria are: Nagero, Duma, Namutina, Jambo, Rasul, Lui, Tore, Muroko, Manguo, Mambe, Kotobi, Yarri, Farak Sika, Madebe, Bangasu, Rimenze, Bazungua, Makpandu, Nadiangere, Kua Diko, Ri-Rangu, Nabiapai, Gangura, Birisi, Ndoromo, Bangazagino, Sangua, Basukangbi Ringasi, Diabio, Yangiri, Ri-Kuangba, Bafuka, Naandi, Andari, Ri-Yubu, Mopai, and Sakure.

== Governor of Western Equatoria ==
- 1976 – 1982: Barnaba Kisanga
- 1982 – 1984: Charles Ali Bilal
- 1984 – 1984: Samuel Abu-John Kabbashi **Lasted 7 days only on first term**
- 1984 – 1985: James Bazia
- 1985 – 1987: Brig. Dominic Kassiano Dombo
- 1987 – 1989: Raphael Zamoi
- 1989 – 1991: Brig. Dominic Dabi Monango
- 1994 – 2005: Due to war in the state, multiple Commissioners/Governors Governed based in Khartoum, Sudan
- 2005: Maj. General Patrick Zamoi (Lasted 6–7 months only on first term)
- 2005 – 2008: Samuel Abu-John Kabbashi (Died in office)
- 2008 – 2010: Jemma Nunu Kumba
- 2010 – 2015: Col. Joseph B. Bakosoro
- 2015: Maj. General Patrick Zamoi (Served until the state was divided into multiple states, then served as Governor of Tombura State until Western Equatoria State was restored back to a single state)
- 2015–2020: (State broken up; 6 successor state governors)
- Since 2020: Maj. General Alfred Futiyo Karaba

== Economy and demographics ==
The economy of Western Equatoria is largely agricultural, producing maize and cassava even when food availability is limited elsewhere in the country. High-quality timber is another of its major agricultural products.

The Equatoria region is more ethnically diverse than other regions of South Sudan. Politically, this has led Equatorians to support federalist reforms both while part of Sudan and South Sudan, as a way of maintaining the various Equatorian groups' political power from being dominated by the larger Dinka population. Western Equatoria is the home of the Moru people, the Zande, Baka, Avukaya, Bari, Bongo, Jur Beli and Jur Mananger tribes.

== See also ==
- Central Equatoria
- Eastern Equatoria
- Equatoria
