= Counties of South Sudan =

The 10 states and 3 administrative areas of South Sudan are divided into 79 counties.

== History ==
Before the independence of South Sudan from Sudan, the Counties were known as Districts. Upon Independence in 2011, the 10 states of South Sudan were divided into 86 counties. More counties were established during the South Sudanese Civil War, when the country increased to 32 states, and the number of counties exceeded 100. However, with the return to 10 states and 3 administrative areas in 2020, South Sudan reverted to 86 counties.

The counties of South Sudan

== Northern Bahr el Ghazal ==
The counties of Northern Bahr el Ghazal State

- Aweil Center County
- Aweil East County
- Aweil North County
- Aweil South County
- Aweil West County

A

== Lakes State ==
The counties of Lakes State

- Awerial County
- Cueibet County
- Rumbek Center County
- Rumbek East County
- Rumbek North County
- Wulu County
- Yirol East County
- Yirol West County
- Adior County

== Warrap ==
The counties of Warrap State

- Gogrial East County
- Gogrial West County
- Tonj East County
- Tonj North County
- Tonj South County
- Twic County

== Western Equatoria ==
The counties of Western Equatoria State

- Ezo County
- Ibba County
- Maridi County
- Mundri East County
- Mundri West County
- Mvolo County
- Nagero County
- Nzara County
- Tambura County
- Yambio County

== Central Equatoria ==
The counties of Central Equatoria State

- Juba County
- Kajo Keji County
- Lainya County
- Morobo County
- Terekeka County
- Yei County

== Eastern Equatoria ==
The counties of Eastern Equatoria State

- Budi County
- Ikotos County
- Lopa County
- Kapoeta East County
- Kapoeta North County
- Kapoeta South County
- Lafon County
- Magwi County
- Torit County

== Jonglei ==
The counties of Jonglei State

- Akobo County
- Ayod County
- Bor County
- Duk County
- Fangak County
- Nyirol County
- Pigi County
- Twic East County
- Uror County

== Unity State ==
The counties of Unity State

- Guit County
- Koch County
- Leer County
- Mayiandit County
- Mayom County
- Panyijar County
- Rubkona County

== Upper Nile State ==
The counties of Upper Nile State

- Baliet County
- Fashoda County
- Longechuk County
- Maban County
- Maiwut County
- Makal County
- Manyo County
- Melut County
- Nasir County
- Panykang County
- Renk County
- Ulang County
- Akoka County

== Ruweng Administrative Area ==
The counties of the Ruweng Administrative Area

- Abiemnom County
- Panrieng County

== Pibor Administrative Area ==
The counties of the Pibor Administrative Area

- Pibor County
- Pochalla North County
- Pochalla South County
- Vertet County (Maruwa)
- Gumuruk County
- Lekuangole County
- Jebel Boma County

== See also ==
- Districts of Sudan
- States of South Sudan
