= Gulumbi Payam =

Gulumbi
- Payam
- Location within South Sudan
- Coordinates: 3°42′36.77″N 30°48′26.24″E
- Country: South Sudan
- Region: Equatoria
- State: Central Equatoria
- County: Morobo County
- Boma: Bomas of Gulumbi Payam

Government
  - Type: Payam Administrator
- Elevation: 1,175 m (3,855 ft)

Gulumbi is a payam in Morobo County, Central Equatoria State, South Sudan. The village and Payam headquarters is located along Yei - Kaya.

== See also ==
- Panyume
- Kimba Payam
- Lujule
- Aboroto
- Kaya
