= Naphtali Hassan Gale =

South Sudanese politician

Naphtali Hassan Gale is a South Sudanese politician from Morobo County, belonging to the Keliko tribe. He was a member of the Central Equatoria State Parliamentary House, representing Lujule West and Wudabi Payams of Morobo County.

Before entering politics, he served in the Keliko Bible translation project. He later held the position of Speaker in the Central Equatoria State Parliamentary House.

== Speakership ==
=== Central Equatoria State ===
He served as Speaker of Central Equatoria State Assembly before the creation of the 32 states in South Sudan, during the governorships of Clement Wani Konga and Juma Malua Ali.

=== Yei River State ===
After the division of the original 10 states of South Sudan into 32 new states, Central Equatoria State was split into the three States: Jubek, Terekeka and Yei River State. Following this, he was then appointed as the Speaker of the Assembly in Yei River State.
