= List of Morobo County Commissioners =

Morobo County is one of the six counties of Central Equatoria State and one of the 79 counties of South Sudan

Since the creation of the county in 2004, 6 people have served as the county's commissioners.

== List ==
List of the Morobo County Commissioners
S/No	Name	Date appointed	Date relieved of duty	Years served as County Commissioner
1	Hon Charles Data Bullen	01-08-2024	Incumbent	
2	Hon Joseph Mawa John Okuba	20-02-2021	01/08/2024	3 Years and 6 Month
3	Hon Poulino Dada Ndoromo	15-02-2020	20-02-2021	1 Year
4	Hon Jacob Toti Fenesa	21-01-2016	23-08-2016	8 Month
5	Hon Mary Apayi Ayige	23-09-2015	21-01-2016	4 Month
6	Hon Moses Soro Nigo	01-09-2012	23-09-2015	3 Years
7	Hon Ofeni Ngota Amitai	25-10-2008	01-09-2012	4 Years
8	Hon Richard Remo Soro	04-09-2004	25-10-2008	4 Years

== Defunct Lujule and Morobo County Commissioners April 2016 to Feb 2020 ==
This List is for the Commissioners who were appointed after the creation of the 32 states on October 2015 and Later in April 2016 Yei River State further split Morobo County into two different counties namely Morobo and Lujule Counties after the creation of the 32 States of South Sudan.

Defunct Morobo County April 2016 to Feb2020
S/No	Name of Commissioner	Year Appointede	Date Relieved	County Served
1	Hon Richard Remo Soro	02-09-2018	20-08-2018	Morobo County
2	Hon Nelson	20-08-2018	2019	Morobo County
3	Hon Poulino Dada Ndoromo	2019	15--02-2020	Morobo County

Defunct Lujule County April 2016 to February 2020
S/No	Name of Commission	Year Appointed	Date Relieved	County Served
1	Hon Jacob Toti Fenesa	23-08-2016		Lujule County
2	Hon Ezi			Lujule County
3	Hon Josep Mawa John Okuba	28-11-2018	15-02-2020	Lujule County

== Gallery ==
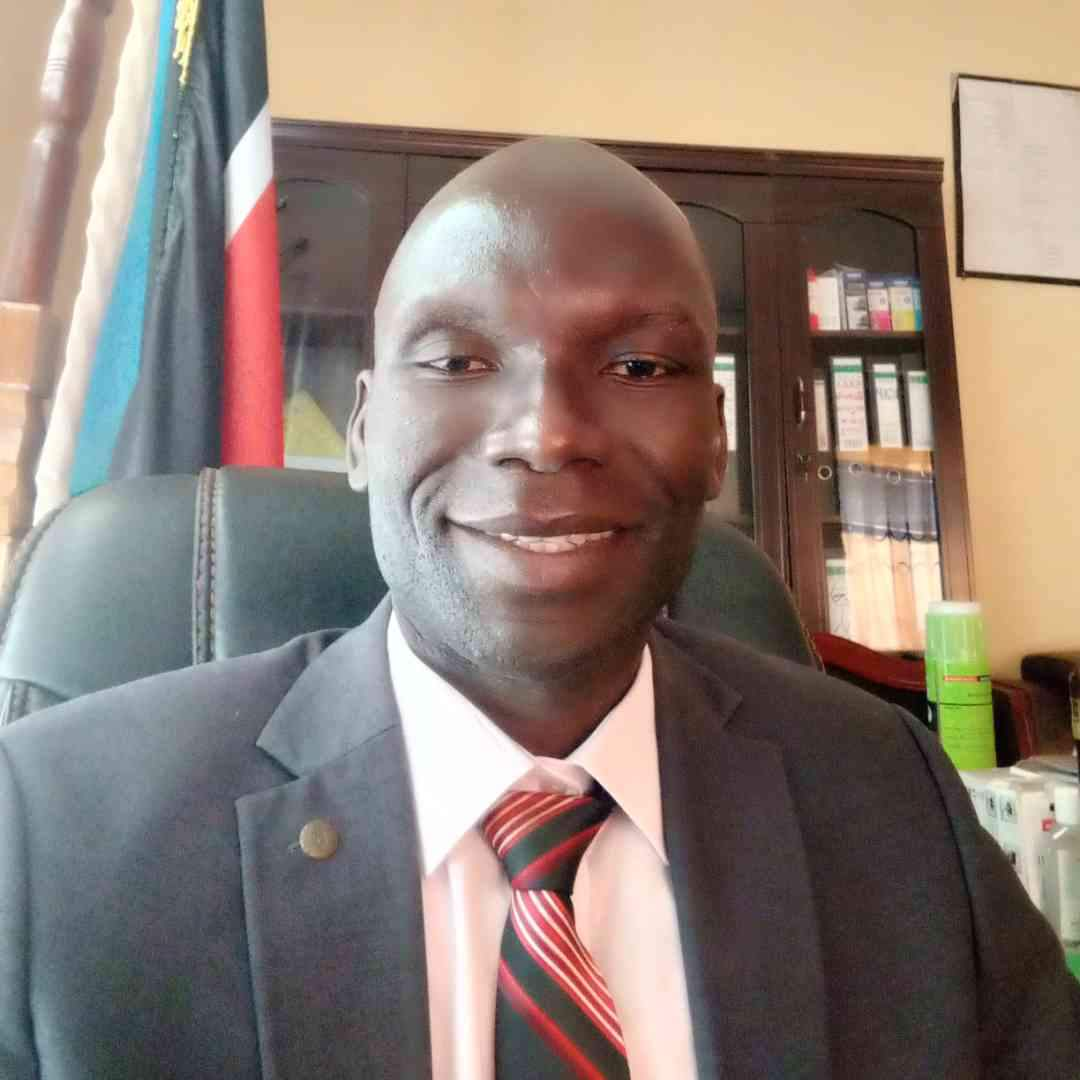
Hon Joseph Mawa Okuba

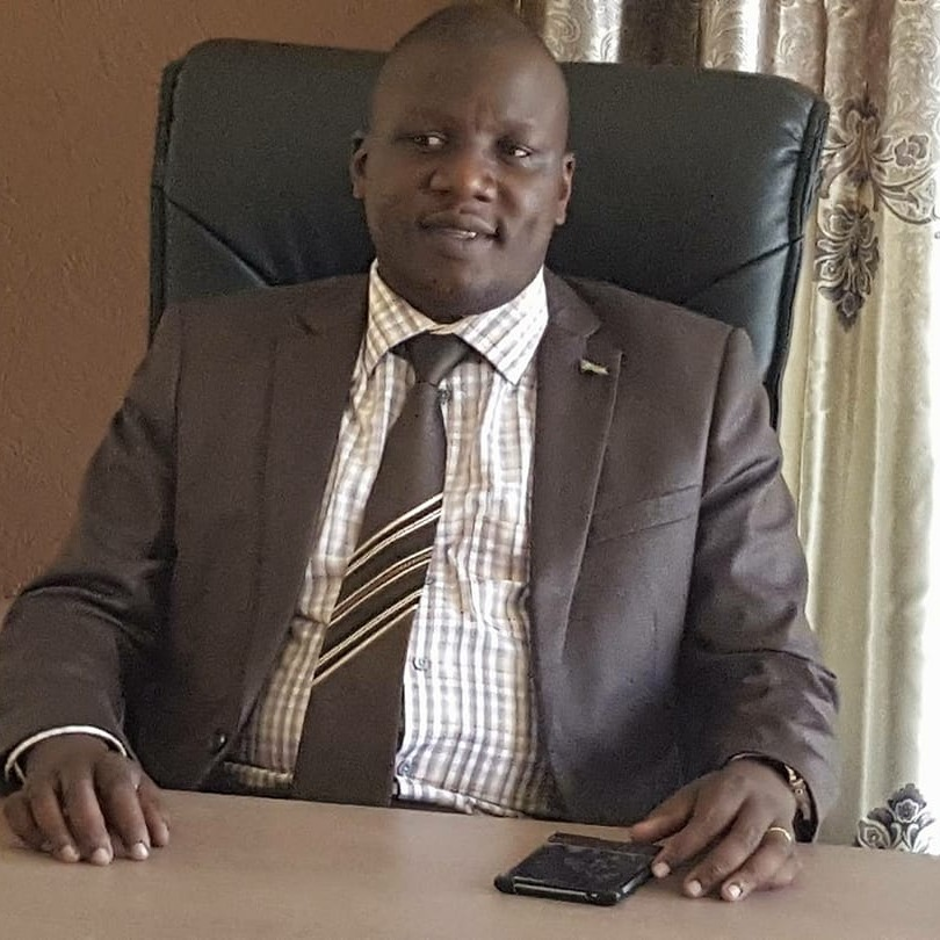
Hon Moses Soro
