= Aga Falls =

Waterfall in Central Equatoria, South Sudan

- Location within South Sudan
- Location: Morobo County, Central Equatoria, South Sudan
- Coordinates: 3°47′3″N 30°37′48″E
- Watercourse: River Yei

Aga Fall is a waterfall on the River Yei in the Geri Boma of Wudabi payam, Morobo County in Central Equatoria, South Sudan.

A plan was announced in 2011, by the Central Equatoria State Government under the leadership of former Governor Clement Wani Konga, to build a power plant on the Aga Falls to supply power to Greater Yei which includes counties of Morobo, Yei, Lainya, and Kajo-Keji.
