= Canadian Economic Development Assistance for South Sudan =

Canadian charity

The Canadian Economic Development Assistance for South Sudan (CEDASS) is a privately funded Canadian registered charity and a registered NGO in South Sudan It was founded in 2005 by British entrepreneur David Tennant and other Canadian philanthropists.

The charity's goal was to disseminate modern farming techniques among the population of South Sudan. With support from President Salva Kiir, the organization set up in 2006 set a farm in Juba County (now Jubek State), named the Jebel Lado Farm Project after a nearby hillock (12 km to the west) that dominates the landscape. The farm is located at , about 28 km north by northeast from Juba and 12 km from Mongalla, between the White Nile and the Koda River, straddling the New and Old Juba-Yei roads.

As of 2011, the Jebel Lado farm had secured from the government a concession for 12,200 acres. From a 50-acre crop in 2008, it has expanded to 1,200 acres by 2018, including white corn, which is sold to the World Food Programme, along with sorghum, rice and vegetables. It has since added a school and a medical and health post, and partnered with the Israel-based Green Horizon project of the Global Group for management and security. As of 2018, the farm employed 50 permanent local farm workers and another 50 to 100 seasonal workers, mainly members of the Bari tribe.
