= Augustino Kiri Gwolo =

South Sudanese politician and military officer (1973–2017)

- Born: Moses Augustino Kiri Gwolo; 1973; Lainya County, Yei River State, South Sudan
- Died: 2017; Juba, South Sudan
- Occupations: Politician and military official

Moses Augustino Kiri Gwolo was a South Sudanese political official who served as the commissioner, the deputy governor of Yei River State and a colonel of the South Sudanese Army.

== Biography ==
Moses Augustino Kiri Gwolo was born in 1973 to the Pojulu tribe of Lainya County to a clan called Bereka in the then Yei River State, which now is called Central Equatoria State.

He was later elected as the commissioner of Lainya County.

== Leadership and administration ==
Augustino Kiri Gwolo entered public office as Commissioner of Lainya County in Central Equatoria State, where he faced significant security challenges along the accident-prone Yei–Lainya highway. In March 2016, following reports of multiple civilian deaths and violence against women, Commissioner Kiri deployed local security patrols and urged community cooperation with authorities to calm the situation. Later that year, Governor David Lokonga Moses appointed him Deputy Governor of Yei River State while he continued to hold the rank of Colonel in the South Sudanese Army. He was sworn into office after being considered by the Church a leader. In his dual civilian and military roles, he worked to improve regional security and civic governance, drawing recognition for his direct leadership during turbulent times. State authorities publicly described him as a respected and disciplined leader at his funeral, where Governor Lokonga also called on residents to follow Kiri’s commitment to peace.

== Contributions ==
Moses Augustino Kiri Gwolo was a social activist who contributed to the well being of Yei River State including voicing the concerns of his people over the years he served in office and making amends to provide their needs. Commissioner of Lainya County & Representative of the Government of Central Equatoria State, Moses Augustino Kiri Gwolo voiced the concerns of the local people. According to Radio Tamzuj, he reportedly advocated for his county to be attended to due to the fact that there were children dying every week because of a lack of healthcare in the county.

== Death ==
In 2017, Moses Augustino Kiri Gwolo died after being diagnosed with yellow fever in the Juba Medical Complex.
