= Animu Athiei =

Activist from South Sudan (born 1963)

- Born: Afekuru Animu Risasi Amitai; 27 August 1983 (age 43); Juba, Central Equatoria, South Sudan
- Citizenship: Stateless

Afekuru Animu Risasi Amitai, popularly known as Animu Athiei, is a youth activist whose South Sudanese citizenship was revoked by the state.

== Biography ==
Athiei was born 27 August 1983 in Juba, Central Equatoria, now in South Sudan. Her parents were Muslim Keliko from Morobo County. Several months after her birth, her family fled to Uganda, where they stayed until returning to South Sudan in 2005 or 2006.

Athiei obtained Ugandan citizenship in May 2009, but following South Sudan's 2011 independence she returned her passport, thus renouncing her citizenship, in March 2012. She obtained South Sudanese citizenship in 2014 with an endorsement from her uncle, as her father had died in 1995. (Note: According to South Sudanese nationality law, a person can be considered a South Sudanese national if their parents or grandparents were born in South Sudan.) She renewed her passport in 2017.

Athiei's citizenship was revoked and her passport was confiscated by the South Sudanese government in 2018 without written cause; she was told orally it was because she was a Ugandan citizen. Athiei filed a civil suit through the Juba High Court in 2019, but the immigration authorities did not respond to summons to file a defence and a hearing was never held. She raised the matter to the African Commission on Human and Peoples' Rights in 2021, which in August 2024 affirmed her "right to nationality" in South Sudan and ruled her rights had been violated under the African Charter. However, the South Sudanese government did not comply with the commission within the allotted 180-day window, leading to condemnations from several human rights organizations, including the Institute for Human Rights and Development in Africa and the Global Movement Against Statelessness.

On 22 December 2021, the South Sudanese National Security Service arrested Athiei and gave her to the Department of Nationality, Passports and Immigration, claiming she illegally obtained a false diplomatic passport. The immigration authorities transported Athiei to the Nimule/Elegu border and attempted to hand her over to the Ugandans on the 26th; however, they refused, as Athiei was not a Ugandan citizen in their records. Athiei was detained in the Juba Northern Division Police Station without charge until 11 January 2022, when she was transferred to Juba Central Prison. While in prison pending trial, Athiei became sick due to uterine fibroids and difficulty breathing, among other conditions; on 31 January she was moved to Juba Teaching Hospital. Athiei was released 10 February on US$2500 bail. Following a February 2026 interview on Channel Africa, multiple diplomats reached out to Athiei, including representatives of the African Union mission and the German ambassador to South Sudan.

Starting October 2016, Animu served as a speechwriter for the office of First Vice President Taban Deng Gai, but was fired in March 2018 without explanation following online posts questioning her citizenship. She was appointed a member of the Transitional National Legislative Assembly by President Salva Kiir in May 2021, representing Morobo County under the ticket of the umbrella group Other Political Parties (OPP). She was replaced less than two weeks days later after public outcry over her alleged Ugandan citizenship, with the chairman of the Keliko community of Morobo County releasing a statement disowning her. Athiei is also the founder of the Animu Athiei Foundation, an organization primarily promoting youth empowerment.
