= Uria Guya Emmanuel =

- Born: March 13, 1985 (age 40); Geri Boma, Wudabi payama, Morobo County
- Occupation: Lawyer
- Title: Honorable

Uria Guya Emmanuel (born 13 March 1985) is a South Sudanese politician and a member of the Central Equatoria State Legislative Assembly, representing Morobo County. He has been involved in legislative oversight and governance matters within the state.

== Early life and education ==
Uria Guya Emmanuel Umboya was born in Geri Boma of Wudabi Payam, Morobo County, Central Equatoria State, South Sudan. He began his education at Wudabi Primary School, where he studied under trees due to the lack of formal school infrastructure. In 2002, he sat for his Primary Leaving Examination at Nyei Primary School, as there was no examination center in Morobo County at the time.

In 2003, he enrolled at Yei Day Senior School and completed his secondary education, obtaining the South Sudan Certificate in 2009. From 2010 to 2012, he pursued a Diploma in Business Administration and Management at the Africa Population Institute in Uganda. In 2013, he joined the University of Juba, where he earned a Bachelor of Laws (LLB) degree. In 2024, he enrolled in a Master of Laws (LLM) program, which he is currently undertaking.

== Political career ==
Uria Guya Emmanuel has played a role in legislative affairs, particularly in matters related to governance and accountability. In August 2023, he was involved in summoning the State Minister of Finance, Planning, and Investment, Viana Kakuli Aggrey, to address allegations of an unauthorized government land transaction. The deal allegedly involved the sale of state-owned land in exchange for financial compensation and vehicles. Emmanuel emphasized the need for adherence to legal procedures and the protection of government property.

In October 2023, following the killing of Chief Elisa Mile in Morobo County by unidentified armed individuals, Emmanuel condemned the attack and called for accountability. He highlighted the security challenges in Morobo despite relative stability in other parts of the country and called for measures to ensure the safety of citizens.

Emmanuel has been an advocate for transparency and the proper management of public resources. His legislative interventions reflect efforts to promote accountability within the Central Equatoria State government. He has raised concerns over governance issues, emphasizing the importance of legal frameworks and due process in administrative decisions.
