= Kupera =

- Payam
- Location within South Sudan
- Coordinates: 4°6′28.44″N 30°57′52.3512″E
- Country: South Sudan
- Sate: Central Equatoria
- County: Lainya County
- Bomas: Kupera Payam has 3 Bomas 1. Korobe 2. Mundu 3. Kupera

Kupera is located in Lainya County of Central Equatoria State, South Sudan.

Kupera was once a County in then Yei River State which exited between April 2016 to 2020 before the 32 States were reverted to the original 10 States of South Sudan.

== Climate Change ==
Kupera is one of the Payams in Lainya County affected by defforestation.
