= River Yei =

River in Central Equatoria, South Sudan

Coordinates: 6°15′N 30°13′E

Location
- Country: South Sudan
- Region: The river flows through Equatoria to Bahr el Ghazel

Physical characteristics
- Source: Lujule Payam, Morobo County
  - location: Panyana Village

Basin features
- Cities: Yei; Mundri West County
- Waterfalls: Aga Falls

River Yei is a river in South Sudan with its source in Panyana Village, Lujule payam in Morobo County of Central Equatoria State.

== Nomenclature ==
The name Yei was derived from the word yii in Kaliko language, meaning "water."

== Features ==
=== Central Equatoria ===
In Central Equatoria, the river flows through Lujule, Morobo County and Yei River County. The river flows through Yei town where the Kembe River joins along Yei - Juba Road.

A notable landmark, Aga Falls, is situated on the River Yei in Wudabi Payam, Morobo County. Aga Falls lies at Geri Boma and has been recognized as a potential site for hydroelectric development.

=== Western Equatoria ===
In Western Equatoria, the river flows through Mundiri west, Lakes State, and Unity State.

== History ==
During the colonial era, the British administration altered local governance and settlement arrangements along the river’s course. They introduced centralized chiefs and resettled villages to combat sleeping sickness.

In March 2010, UNMIS and the World Food Programme funded construction of a 42-meter single-lane bridge in Yei town. This key bridge spans the River Yei and improved trade routes between the town and its Ugandan and Congolese neighbors.

In 2011 the government of Central Equatoria State under the leadership of Governor Clement Wani Konga planned to launch a power plant in Morobo County.
