= Aboroto Village =

Aboroto
- Village
- Aboroto
- Location within South Sudan
- Coordinates: 3°39′39.8″N 30°42′35.4″E
- Country: South Sudan
- Region: Equatoria
- State: Central Equatoria
- County: Morobo County
- Payam: Lujule
- Boma: Kembe

Government
  - Type: Village Headmen
- Time zone: UTC+2 (South Sudan Standard Time)

Aboroto is a village located in Lujule payam of Morobo County in Central Equatoria State of South Sudan. It is also where Aboroto PHCC is located.

The village is near the border with DR Congo's Ituri Provence and was a historical business center for coffee in the early 1970s.

In 2019, the South Sudan government force clashed with the NAS force along Aboroto on 3°39′39.8″N 30°42′35.4″E
