= Iwatoku =

Watoka Iwatoku Iwatuku
- Location within South Sudan
- Coordinates: 3°45′12.0″N 30°37′44.9″E
- Country: South Sudan
- Region: Equatoria
- State: Central Equatoria
- County: Morobo County
- Payam: Wudabi

Iwatoku or Iwatuku (also known as Watoka) is a village in wudabi Payam, Morobo County, Central Equatoria State, South Sudan.

Iwatoku is located near to South Sudan's border with the Democratic Republic of the Congo and is the location of the Watoka Coffee and Tobacco plantation.
