= List of power stations in South Sudan =

This article lists all power stations in South Sudan.

== Hydroelectric power stations ==
Hydroelectric station	Community	Coordinates	Type	Capacity	Year completed	Name of reservoir	River
Juba Power Station	Juba, Central Equatoria State		Run of river	5.0 MW	2006		River Nile
Kapoeta Power Station	Kapoeta, Eastern Equatoria State		Run of river	0.9 MW	2011		Narus River
Maridi Power Station	Maridi, Western Equatoria State		Run of river	0.9 MW	2011		River Maridi
Yei Power Station	Yei, Central Equatoria State		Run of river	1.2 MW	2008		River Yei

== Proposed hydroelectric power stations ==
Hydroelectric station	Community	Coordinates	Type	Capacity	Year completed	Name of reservoir	River
Fula-Nimule Power Station	Nimule, Eastern Equatoria State		Run of river	42.0 MW	TBD		River Nile

== Thermal power stations ==
Thermal power station	Fuel type	No of units	Capacity per unit (in MW)	Total capacity (in MW)	Remarks
Bor Power Station	Diesel	2	1	2	Under construction
Rumbek Power Station	Diesel	2	1	2	Under construction
Wau Power Station	Diesel	2	1	2	Operational
Yambio Power Station	Diesel	2	1	2	Under construction
Juba (Wärtsilä)	Diesel	8	1.5	12	Operational
Juba (Cummins)	Diesel	5	1	5	Not operational
Malakal	Diesel	6	0.8	4.8	Operational
Juba Thermal Power Station	Diesel	3	11	33 (under expansion to 100)	Operational

== Solar ==
Solar power station	Community	Coordinates	Fuel type	Capacity (megawatts)	Year completed	Owner	Notes
Juba Solar Power Station	Juba	04°52′10″N 31°29′23″E	Solar	20	2023 (Expected)	Juba Solar Consortium	

== See also ==
- List of largest power stations in the world
- List of power stations in Africa
