= Bahr al Jabal =

Bahr al Jabal (Arabic: Sea of the Mountain) may refer to:

- Bahr al Jabal (river), a section of the White Nile between Nimule and Lake No
- Bahr al Jabal, a state of Southern Sudan (current South Sudan) renamed Central Equatoria in 2005
