= Yei River State =

State of South Sudan from 2015 to 2020

- State
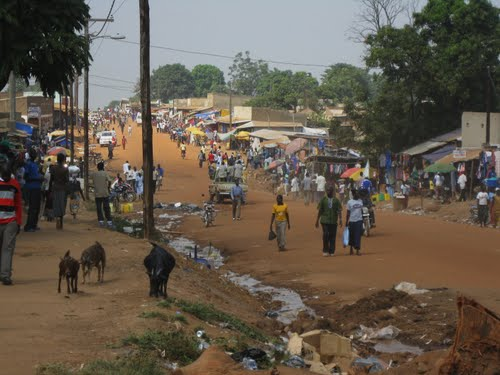
- Yei River County In 2010

- Location of Yei River State in South Sudan
- Country: South Sudan
- Capital: Yei
- Number of Counties: 10

Population (2014 Estimate)
  - Total: 788,610

Yei River State was a state in South Sudan that existed from 2 October 2015 to 22 February 2020, when it became a part of the state of Central Equatoria.

== Location ==
The state was located in the Equatoria region and bordered Maridi and Amadi to the north, Jubek to the northeast, and Imatong to the east. Yei River State, along with Jubek State and Terekeka State was part of the former state of Central Equatoria. The capital and largest city of Yei River State is Yei, South Sudan, with the city having an estimated population of 260,720 in 2014.

== History ==
On 2 October 2015, President Salva Kiir issued a decree establishing 28 states in place of the 10 constitutionally established states. The decree established the new states largely along ethnic lines; however, a number of opposition parties and civil society groups challenged the constitutionality of the decree. Kiir later resolved to take it to parliament for approval as a constitutional amendment. In November of that year, the South Sudanese parliament empowered President Kiir to create new states. David Lokonga Moses was appointed Governor on 24 December 2015.

In November 2017, Augustino Kiri Gwolo, the Deputy Governor of Yei River State and also a colonel in the army, died of yellow fever in Juba. He was replaced by Brig. Gen Morjan Abraham Wani Yoane Bondo who defected to the National Salvation Front (NAS) in 2016 after the insurgence of the civil war in South Sudan.

Since its creation in 2017, the National Salvation Front insurgency was located primarily in Yei River State.

== Geography ==
=== Administrative divisions ===
After the split up, Yei River State broke down even further to a total of 10 counties in the state (created in April 2016). The 10 counties are part of the 180 counties in South Sudan. The 10 counties consist of the following:

- Former Kajo-Keji County:
  - Kajo-Keji
  - ŋepo (Nyepo)
  - Kangapo one
  - Kangapo Two
  - liwolo
- Former Lainya County:
  - Lainya
  - Kupera
- Former Morobo County
  - Morobo
  - Lujulo
- Former Yei River County:
  - Yei
  - Otogo
  - Tore
  - Mugwo

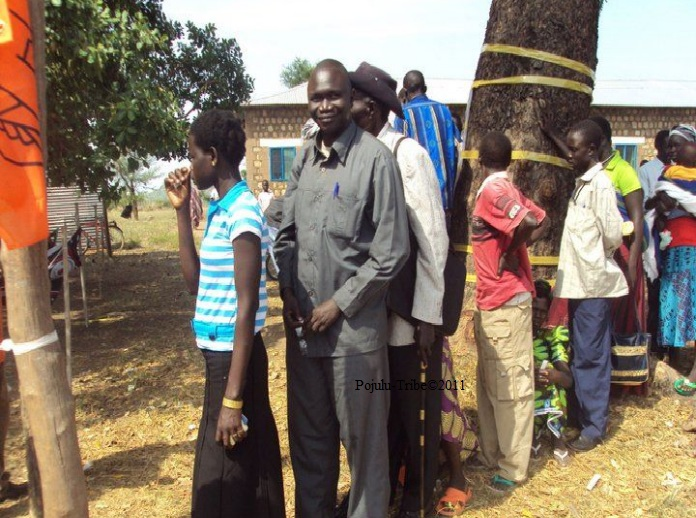
People voting in Lainya 2011

The counties are further sub-divided into payams, and the payams are then further sub-divided into bomas. Namely:

BOMAS IN MUGWO

1. Yari boma
2. Payawa boma
3. Jombu boma
4. longamere boma

BOMAS UNDER YEI PANAM

1. Ronyi boma is located three miles kaya road.
2. Sanja-asiri boma is located 5kilometres from yei lasu aba road

=== Towns and cities ===
Yei is the most populous town in Yei River State, with an estimated population of over 260,000 in 2014. The city of Yei is located in Yei River County. Other populated towns in Yei River State include Dimo (located on the border with the Democratic Republic of the Congo), Kajo Keji, and Kaya. Kajo Keji is the second most populous city in the state, with an estimated population of 196,000 in 2010.

== Ethnic groups ==
A 2013 survey had reported a majority of Pojulu and Kakwa people, with minorities of Avukaya, Baka, Keliko, and Mundu people, though other ethnic groups from all parts of South Sudan are also living there.
