= Jubek State =

2015–2020 state in South Sudan

- Former States of South Sudan
- 2015–2020
- Location of Jubek State in South Sudan
- Capital: Juba
- Population
  - 2014: 492,970
- History
  - Established: October 2 2015
  - Disestablished: February 22 2020
- Political subdivisions: 14 Counties
Preceded by	Succeeded by
Central Equatoria	Central Equatoria
- Today part of: Central Equatoria

Jubek State was a state in South Sudan that existed between 2 October 2015 and 22 February 2020. It contained the national capital, Juba, which is also the largest city in South Sudan. The state bordered include Yei River county to the southwest, Amadi county to the west, Terekeka county to the north, and Imatong county to the east.

== History ==
On 2 October 2015, the president of South Sudan issued a decree establishing 28 states in order to replace the 10 constitutionally established states. The decree established the new states mostly among ethnic lines. A number of opposition parties and civil society groups challenged the constitutionality of the decree, and these actions led to president Salva Kiir to take the decree to parliament for approval as a constitutional amendment. In November the South Sudanese parliament empowered President Kiir to create new states.

As part of that reorganization, the former Juba County was turned into a separate state and renamed "Jubek". Augustino Jadalla Wani was appointed as the governor of Jubek State on 24 December 2015.

== Administrative divisions ==
As part of the 2016 reorganization, Jubek State was divided into fourteen counties, that were fully implemented on 16 September 2016. They are Lodu, Luri, Mongalla, Gondokoro, Rejaf, Wonduruba, Lobonok, Bungu, Ganji (Ganzi), Dollo, Rokon, Lyria and Oponi.

Each county also got its own commissioner.

== Geography ==
=== Rivers ===
The state is crossed from south to north by the White Nile, which is called locally Bahr el-Jebel ("Mountain River" in Arabic) or Sukiri. The capital Juba is located on its west bank. The state contains several tributaries of the White Nile, including the Koda, Kaia, Ayi, Loiforo (Lefureur), Kit, Luri, Nvigera, Lori, and Gwar.

=== Towns and cities ===
Juba is the capital of Jubek state, as it was of the former Juba County. It is also the capital and most populous city of the entre country of South Sudan.

The following is a partial list of the towns and cities in Jubek (and formerly in Juba County):

==== County capitals ====
- Lodu
- Luri
- Mongalla 5.199°N 31.768°E
- Dollo 4.739°N 30.935°E
- Gondokoro 4.9072°N 31.6614°E
- Rejaf 4.743°N 31.592°E
- Wonduruba
- Lobonok
- Bungu
- Ganji (Ganzi)
- Rokon 5.132°N 30.942°E
- Lyria
- Oponi

==== Other towns and villages ====
- Buko 5.1791°N 31.2732°E
- Guruloguthu 5.1974°N 31.1979°E
- Jalang 5.061°N 31.673°E
- Jigokwe 4.596°N 31.062°E
- Kimangoro 4.769°N 31.131°E
- Lado Koda 5.142°N 31.713°E
- Lado 5.038°N 31.688°E
- Logogvi or Logogwi 5.1029°N 31.4414°E 5.0941°N 31.4594°E 5.0760°N 31.4600°E
- Luala 5.026°N 31.651°E
- Ludo Kenyi 5.0633°N 31.5350°E 5.065°N 31.530°E
- Mussikidolk 4.6264°N 31.0784°E
- Murgan 5.0945°N 31.5365°E
- Nija 5.051°N 31.668°E
- Rija 4.733°N 31.002°E
- Rombe Lako 5.145°N 31.643°E
- Tijor 5.1364°N 31.1811°E
- Wulikare 5.0831°N 31.4559°E

=== Peaks ===
This is a partial list of hills and mountains in Jubek State:

- Jebel Dolo 4.8991°N 31.0690°E
- Jebeli Germok 4.8720°N 31.2279°E
- Jebel Kamarok 4.7927°N 31.4316°E
- Jebel Kunufi 4.8625°N 31.4330°E
- Jebel Lado 5.1023°N 31.5842°E
- Jebel Malakwa 4.6404°N 31.1401°E
- Jebel Malakea 4.9431°N 31.2869°E
- Jebel Merikia 4.7263°N 31.1394°E
- Jebel Miri, or Miri Hills, 4.7612°N 31.0490°E
- Jebel Rija 4.7419°N 31.0154°E
