= Emmanuel Adil Anthony =

South Sudanese politician

Governor of Central Equatoria State
- Incumbent
- Assumed office 17 November 2025
- Preceded by: Rabi Mujung Emmanuel
- In office 29 June 2020 – 2 May 2024
- Preceded by: Position vacant
- Succeeded by: Augustino Jadalla Wani

Governor of Yei River State
- In office 16 February 2018 – 22 February 2020
- Preceded by: David Lokonga Moses
- Succeeded by: Position abolished

Personal details
- Citizenship: South Sudan
- Party: SPLM
- Spouse: Josephine Napon Cosmos

Emmanuel Adil Anthony is a South Sudanese politician and is the governor of Central Equatoria State, having been reappointed to the position in November 2025.

== Early life and education ==
Adil is an ethnic Kakwa. President Salva Kiir appointed Adil as the governor of Yei River State on 16 February 2018, replacing David Lokonga Moses. As governor, Adil said he wanted to restore peace and stability to Yei River State by reconciling with armed groups. Adil reshuffled his cabinet and replaced some county commissioners around 17 June 2018.

== R-ARCSS Involvement ==
Adil supported the peace agreement in August 2018 that aimed to end the South Sudanese Civil War. South Sudanese refugees began returning to Yei River State from the Democratic Republic of the Congo and Uganda at the beginning of 2019. Adil reshuffled his cabinet again on 22 August 2019. Yei River State was dissolved and became part of Central Equatoria State when South Sudan reverted to ten states on 22 February 2020.

Adil was appointed to be the governor of Central Equatoria State on 29 June 2020, as one of the six governors eligible to be appointed by the SPLM under the R-ARCSS. The state did not have a governor from 22 February to 29 June. Adil was dismissed as governor on 2 May 2024, but was reappointed on 17 November 2025.
