= South Sudan Electricity Corporation =

South Sudan Electricity Corporation (SSEC)
- Company type: Parastatal
- Industry: Power generation
- Founded: 2012
- Products: Electricity

The South Sudan Electricity Corporation (SSEC) is a parastatal company whose primary purpose is to generate electric power for use in South Sudan and for sale to neighboring countries.

== History ==
Following the split from Sudan, South Sudan signed THE SOUTHERN SUDAN ELECTRICITY CORPORATION ACT, 2011 into law. Setting up the establishment of the SSEC in 2012 under the Ministry of Energy and Mining. At that point the country was only producing 22 MW of installed electricity generation capacity split into three isolated networks with only 1% of the country's nine-million people having access to electricity.

On January 24, 2014, the SSEC was approved for a grant from the African Development Bank Group to rehabilitate and expand the distribution networks in Juba.

== SSEC Timeline ==
- January 24, 2014: Received a US$26 million dollar grant from African Development Bank Group to rehabilitate and expand the distribution networks in Juba.

== Power stations ==
- Juba Electric Distribution Company Ltd. (JEDCO) 48% ownership

=== Operational stations ===
Juba Solar Power Station

== See also ==
- List of power stations in South Sudan
- Energy in South Sudan
