= Ofeni Ngota =

South Sudanese politician

Morobo County Commissioner
- Preceded by: Richard Remo
- Succeeded by: Moses Soro
- Constituency: Morobo County

Personal details
- Born: Ofeni Ngota Morobo

Ofen Ngota is a South Sudanese politician. He served as Commissioner of Morobo County, Central Equatoria from 2008 to 2013 before he was removed from office as Morobo County Commissioner.

When in office as the Commissioner of Morobo County he suspended the Morobo County Executive Direct and the County Controller of Accounts over alleged misconduct and abuse of office after the County Legislative Council decided to suspend the officials by casting a vote of no confidence against the County Executive Director and the County Controller of Accounts.

He is currently working in the Army and in the Security Department.
