= Juba Solar Power Station =

Solar power station in South Sudan

- Country: South Sudan
- Location: Juba, Central Equatoria
- Coordinates: 04°52′10″N 31°29′23″E
- Status: Proposed
- Construction began: 2022 Expected
- Commission date: 2023 Expected
- Construction cost: US$45 million
- Owner: Juba Solar Energy Company
- Operator: Juba Solar Energy Company

Solar farm
- Type: Flat-panel PV
- Site area: 25 hectares (62 acres)

Power generation
- Nameplate capacity: 20 MW (27,000 hp)
- Annual net output: 29 GWh

The Juba Solar Power Station is a proposed 20 MW (27,000 hp) solar power plant in South Sudan. The solar farm is under development by a consortium comprising Elsewedy Electric Company of Egypt, Asunim Solar from the United Arab Emirates (UAE) and I-kWh Company, an energy consultancy firm also based in the UAE. The solar farm will have an attached battery energy storage system rated at 35MWh. The off-taker is the South Sudanese Ministry of Electricity, Dams, Irrigation and Water Resources, represented by South Sudan Electricity Corporation, the national electric utility parastatal company.

== Location ==
The power station would be located on a 25 hectares (62 acres) piece of real estate, approximately 20 kilometres (12 mi) from Juba, the capital and largest city of South Sudan.

== Overview ==
In March 2020, South Sudan's installed generation capacity was reported as approximately 130 MW. Most of the electricity in the country is concentrated in Juba the capital and in the regional centers of Malakal and Wau. At that time the demand for electricity in the county was estimated at over 300 MW and growing. Nearly all electricity sources in the country are fossil-fuel based, with attendant challenges of cost and environmental pollution. There are plans to build new generation stations and to import electricity from neighboring Ethiopia, Sudan and Uganda, but the civil war has hindered progress in that direction. This power station is an attempt to (a) diversify the country's generation mix (b) increase the country's generation capacity and (c) increase the number of South Sudan's homes, businesses and industries connected to the national grid.

== Funding ==
The power station is reported to cost an estimated US$45 million to construct. The project has received a loan from the African Export–Import Bank.

== See also ==
- List of power stations in South Sudan
