= Samuel Suba =

South Sudanese politician

Samuel Suba is a South Sudanese politician. He was Commissioner of Lainya County, Central Equatoria., south Sudan, he was born of pure pojulu in LAINYA COUNTY, he growth up in lainya county and started he educational journey from primary one(1) until he graduated in makerere University in uganda, after graduating he become a commissioner of LAINYA COUNTY succeeding Vincent kujo lubong from the year 2009-2012. After which he was promoted to be a state minister of information of central equatorial State. 2015 he was appointed as a deputy Governor of central equatorial State by degree by the governor of central equatorial State replace manase lomole. In 2016, the south Sudan civil war broke out, and joined the Sudan people liberation movement in opposition(spla/m,io)
