= Kimba Payam =

Kimba
- Payam
- Country: South Sudan
- Region: Equatoria
- State: Central Equatoria
- County: Morobo County

Government
  - Type: Payam Administrator
- Time zone: UTC+3 (South Sudan Standard Time)

Kimba is a Payams Located in Morobo County, South Sudan bordering the DR Congo and Uganda.

== Bomas of Kimba ==
Kimba Payam is having four Bomas which are then subdivided into villages

1. Kaya Boma
2. Kimba Boma
3. Yondu Boma

== Schools in Kimba Payam ==
- kaya primary school
- yondu primary school
- dodolabe primary school
- kimba primary school

== Markets in kimba payam ==
1. kimba market
2. yondu market
3. kaya market
