= Wulikare, South Sudan =

Small settlement in Jubek State, South Sudan

Coordinates: 5.0745°N 31.4665°E

Wulikare is a small settlement in Juba County, Central Equatoria, South Sudan, about 0.5 km south of the Koda River, 4 km west of Ludo Kenyi, 14 km from the Jebel Lado mountain, 37 km southwest of Mongalla, and 29 km from the state capital Juba It is located near on the road from Juba to Buko, Tijor, and Rokon.
