= Mawa A. Moses =

South Sudanese politician

Mawa A. Moses is a South Sudanese politician and Minister of Roads and Bridges for Central Equatoria State in the Transitional Government of National Unity (R-TGoNU). Moses was appointed onto the ministerial position in February 2021 when President Salva Kiir reconstituted the State Government.

== Career ==
Mawa A. Moses first served as the minister for information and communication for the defunct Yei River State, before President Kiir reversed the 32 States
