= Dimo, South Sudan =

Dimo
- Boma
- Location of the South Sudan – Democratic Republic of the Congo border
- Coordinates: 3°55′59″N 30°22′59″E
- Country: South Sudan
- Region: Equatoria
- State: Central Equatoria
- County: Yei River County

Dimo is a Boma in Yei River County, Central Equatoria in South Sudan, on the border with the Democratic Republic of the Congo.
