= Lujule =

- Payam
- Motto: Tru Alo Ba'Ora
- Location in South Sudan
- Coordinates: 3°41′2.92″N 30°40′41″E
- County: South Sudan
- Region: Equatoria
- State: Central Equatoria
- County: Morobo County
- Number of Bomas 3: The Bomas of Lujule West Payam: 1. Kembe. 2. Yugufe. 3. Kendre

Government
  - Type: Payam Administrator
  - commissioner: Mawa Joseph Okuba
- Elevation: 3,921 ft (1,195 m)

Population (2008)
  - Total: 16,786
- Time zone: UTC+3 (South Sudan Standard Time)

Lujule was a county in then Yei River State, South Sudan that existed April 2016 and 22 February 2020. It is located at 3°41′2.92″N 30°40′41″E, in the elevation of 1195 metres.

== Social services ==
=== Schools ===
1. Kirinya Primary School 2. Gomonja Primary School 3. Yugufe Primary School

4.Aworo Primary School. 5.Ombaci Keliko Primary School etc.

==== Health services ====
===== Churches =====
1.Aworo Parish

2.Bodàndi Church

3.Panyana Dioses

== History ==
On 2 October 2015, President Salva Kiir issued a decree establishing 28 states in place of the 10 constitutionally established states. The decree established the new states largely along ethnic lines. A number of opposition parties and civil society groups challenged the constitutionality of the decree. Kiir later resolved to take it to parliament for approval as a constitutional amendment. In November of that year, the South Sudanese parliament empowered President Kiir to create new states. David Lokonga Moses was appointed Governor on 24 December 2015.

After the split up, Yei River State broke down even further for a total of 13 counties in the state (created in April 2016). The 10 counties are part of the 180 counties in South Sudan. The 13counties are consisted of the following:

- Former Kajo-Keji County:
  - Kajo-Keji
  - ŋepo (Nyepo)
  - Kangapo
  - Liwolo
- Former Lainya County:
  - Lainya
  - Kupera
- Former Morobo County
  - Morobo
  - Lujule
- Former Yei River County:
  - Yei
  - Otogo
  - Tore
  - Mugwo

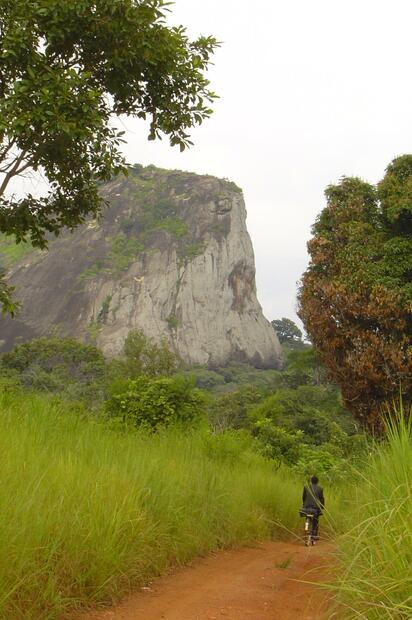

== Climate ==
Lujulo has a Tropical savanna climate (Aw) with dry, warm winters and wet, cooler summers. Due to its elevation, the average temperatures are slightly cooler than many places with this climate.

Climate data for Lujule
Month	Jan	Feb	Mar	Apr	May	Jun	Jul	Aug	Sep	Oct	Nov	Dec	Year
Mean daily maximum °C (°F)	32.2 (90.0)	32.4 (90.3)	31.9 (89.4)	30.5 (86.9)	29.5 (85.1)	28.4 (83.1)	27.2 (81.0)	27.6 (81.7)	28.3 (82.9)	28.7 (83.7)	29.8 (85.6)	30.9 (87.6)	29.8 (85.6)
Daily mean °C (°F)	24.6 (76.3)	25.2 (77.4)	25.3 (77.5)	24.4 (75.9)	23.6 (74.5)	23 (73)	22.2 (72.0)	22.2 (72.0)	22.7 (72.9)	22.8 (73.0)	23.7 (74.7)	23.7 (74.7)	23.6 (74.5)
Mean daily minimum °C (°F)	17 (63)	18.1 (64.6)	18.8 (65.8)	18.3 (64.9)	17.8 (64.0)	17.6 (63.7)	17.2 (63.0)	16.9 (62.4)	17.1 (62.8)	17 (63)	17.6 (63.7)	16.6 (61.9)	17.5 (63.6)
Average precipitation mm (inches)	16 (0.6)	32 (1.3)	93 (3.7)	154 (6.1)	176 (6.9)	170 (6.7)	181 (7.1)	224 (8.8)	188 (7.4)	197 (7.8)	88 (3.5)	27 (1.1)	1,546 (61)
Source: Climate-Data.org
