= Rija, South Sudan =

Settlement in Jubek State, South Sudan

Coordinates: 4.733°N 31.002°E

Rija is a small settlement in Juba County, Central Equatoria, South Sudan, about 6 km east of Dollo and 60 km west and 15 km south of the state capital Juba.
