= Lado Koda, South Sudan =

Coordinates: 5.142°N 31.713°E

Lado Koda is a small town in Terekeka County, Central Equatoria, South Sudan, about 2 km northwest of the Koda River outlet on the White Nile, 8 km southwest of Mongalla, 14 km north by northeast of Luala, and 36 km from the state capital Juba and 60 km west and 15 km south of the state capital Juba. It is located just north of the Koda River's floodplain, on the new Juba-Terekeka road (Khor Mobil).
