= Kaya, South Sudan =

Kaya
- Location in South Sudan; Placement on map is approximate
- Coordinates: 03°33′00″N 30°52′48″E
- Country: South Sudan
- State: Central Equatoria
- County: Morobo
- Time zone: UTC+2 (CAT)
- Climate: Aw

Kaya is a city in Central Equatoria, South Sudan.

== Location ==
The city is located in Kimba Payam, Morobo County, Central Equatoria State, in extreme southwestern South Sudan. It is located near the international border with the Republic of Uganda. Kaya is located approximately 78 kilometres (48 mi), by road, southeast of Yei the nearest large city. This location lies approximately 220 kilometres (140 mi), by road, south of Juba, the capital of South Sudan and largest city in the country. Kaya sits directly across the border from Oraba, in Uganda.

== History ==
Kaya was a battle scene during the Second Sudanese Civil War and was conquered by the Sudanese People's Liberation Army during Operation Thunderbolt on 10 March 1997.

=== Foreign help ===
On October 6, 2017, Uganda pledged to supply power to two South Sudanese border towns as part of the Eastern Africa Power Pool agreement. The agreement calls on all member states to connect electricity to each other. Uganda's energy minister Simon D'Ujanga said "400 kilo-volts of power will be supplied to the towns of Kaya and Nimule to boost socio-economic activities in the border areas".

== Demographics ==
There are no reliable population estimates for the city because:

- The Second Sudanese Civil War (1983–2005) forced many citizens to flee the city. Since the signing of the Comprehensive Peace Agreement in January 2005, a constant stream of South Sudanese returnees use the city as a transit point to re-enter the country
- Kaya is a busy commercial center, attracting traders from South Sudan, Uganda and the Democratic Republic of the Congo

== Economy ==
The city's infrastructure was badly damaged during the civil war. However, since the cessation of hostilities in 2005, commercial life is gradually returning to the city. The road between Kaya and Yei was repaired. It was financed by the United Nations Human Settlements Programme and the World Food Programme. With those repairs completed, the travel time between Kaya and Yei was reduced from five hours to one. The city is served by a branch of Equity Bank South Sudan Limited.

== Points of interest ==
The following points of interest are found in or near the city:

- The offices of Kaya City Council
- The administrative headquarters of Kaya Payam
- Kaya Central Market
- A presbyterian church, built in 2003
- The Kaya HIV/AIDS Health Center - built in 2010 with USAID funds, the center offers counselling testing and treatment
- The precise tripoint of the international borders of South Sudan, Uganda, and the Democratic Republic of the Congo lies a few kilometres south of Kaya

== Clans in Kaya ==
- Irava
- Mujuru
- Itori

== Common languages spoken in Kaya ==
- English
- Kiswahili
- Juba Arabic
- Kakwa
- Lugbara
- Pojulu
- Kuku
- Mundari
- Lingala
- Dinka
- Nuer
- Sulk
- Zande
- Abukaya
- Lugand

== See also ==
- Equatoria
- List of cities in South Sudan
