= Juba Thermal Power Station =

South Sudanese power station

- Country: South Sudan
- Location: Juba
- Coordinates: 04°50′38″N 31°38′05″E
- Status: Operational
- Commission date: 20 November 2019

Thermal power station
- Primary fuel: Diesel fuel

Power generation
- Nameplate capacity: 33 MW (Under Expansion to 100 Megawatts)

Juba Thermal Power Station is a 33 MW Diesel fuel-fired thermal power plant in South Sudan. The power station is being expanded to generate a total of 100 megawatts.

== Location ==
The power plant is located along the River Nile, in the city of Juba, the capital and largest city of South Sudan. The geographical coordinates of Juba Thermal Power Station are: 04°50′38″N, 31°38′05″E (Latitude:4.843889; Longitude:31.634722).

== Overview ==
Juba Thermal Power Station was developed and operated by the Ezra Group of Companies, based in Eritrea. The plant, which opened in November 2019, serves about 100,000 households and is the first phase in a larger plan to bring 100 megawatts of new power to the world's newest country by the end of 2021.

== Funding ==
The Ezra Group plans to spend US$290 million in building generation capacity of 100 megawatts in South Sudan, over the next few years. The government of South Sudan is expected to pay back that loan over the next 17 years, using funds generated from electricity sales to individuals, businesses and factories.

== See also ==
- List of power stations in South Sudan
- List of power stations in Africa
