= Joseph Mawa =

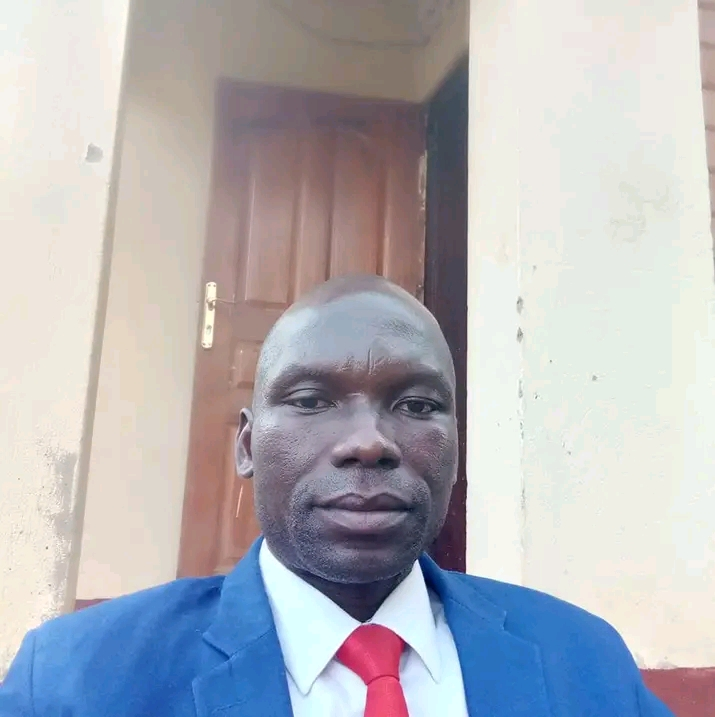
Joseph Mawa in 2022

Joseph Mawa is the former County Commissioner of Morobo County, central Equatoria State, South Sudan. He served in this capacity since 2018. Mawa is known for his efforts in promoting peace and development in the region, particularly during the period of political instability in South Sudan

== Early life and education ==
Joseph Mawa was born in Lodroko Village in Lujule Payam of Morobo County and completed his early education in Morobo.

== Appointment as County Commissioner ==
In 2021, Mawa was appointed as the County Commissioner of Morobo. As the County Commissioner, he has focused on key areas of development, including: Promoting peace and security in the region. - Infrastructure development, such as the construction of schools and health facilities. - Supporting agricultural activities to improve local livelihoods.Hon. Joseph Mawa Okuba was reappointed again in 2026.

== Challenges and Achievements ==
During his tenure, Mawa has faced significant challenges, particularly regarding the ongoing conflict and displacement in South Sudan. However, his leadership has been instrumental in facilitating dialogue between various community groups and supporting humanitarian efforts.

Some of his notable achievements include partnering with international organizations to improve service delivery in the region, Successfully overseeing the rebuilding of infrastructure damaged by conflict and Supporting returnee resettlement and reintegration efforts in Morobo County.

== Personal life ==
Joseph Mawa is married to Rose Kabasi, and is a father. He is an advocate for education and healthcare, and his leadership has earned him respect within and beyond his community.
