= Juba Electric Distribution Company =

Electric power distribution company in South Sudan

Juba Electric Distribution Company Ltd.
- Trade name: JEDCO
- Type: Public-private partnership
- Industry: Electric power distribution
- Founded: May 2018
- Headquarters: Juba, South Sudan
- Area served: Juba metropolitan area
- Owners: Ezra Construction & Development Group (52%), South Sudan Electricity Corporation (48%)
- Website: https://www.jedcopower.com

Juba Electric Distribution Company Ltd. (JEDCO) is an electricity distribution company serving Juba the capital city of South Sudan. It was founded in May 2018 as a public private partnership between Ezra Construction & Development Group Ltd. and the state owned South Sudan Electricity Corporation. JEDCO manages the city's electricity distribution network which providing prepaid metering, customer connections and maintenance services.

== History ==
JEDCO was formed in May 2018 following a concession agreement with the Government of South Sudan to manage electricity distribution in Juba. It began operations in November 2019 after the commissioning of the Ezra thermal power plant, marking the first privately managed electricity distribution system in the country.

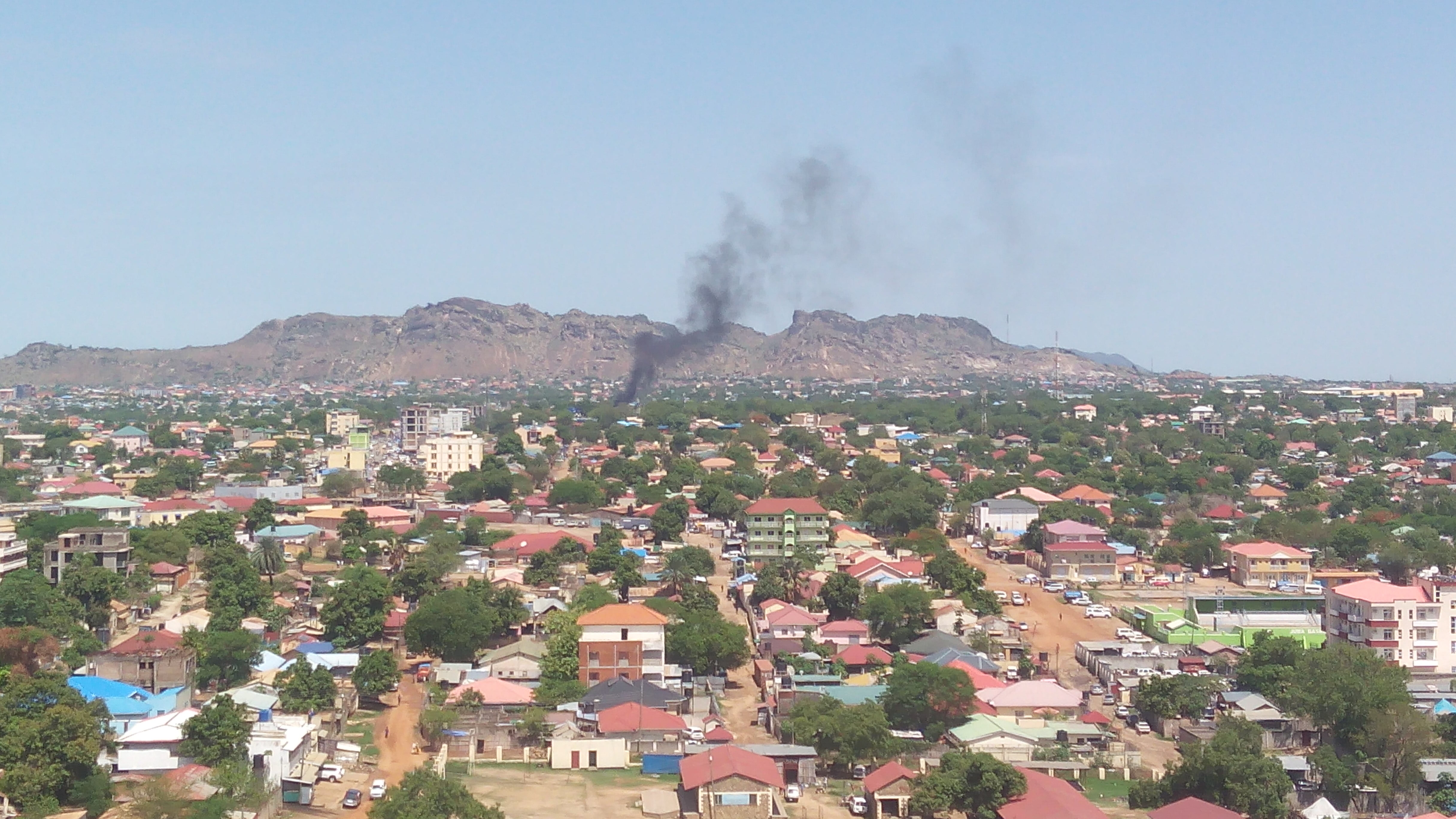
Panorama of Juba, South Sudan's capital, served by JEDCO.

In January 2021, JEDCO suspended electricity supply in Juba due to difficulties in accessing foreign currency required for fuel and operational payments. The disruption led to public complaints and negotiations with government authorities regarding electricity supply and tariffs.

== Operations ==
JEDCO distributes electricity within Juba and manages the city's distribution network. Its services include prepaid electricity supply, new customer connections, network maintenance and emergency response.

In the 2025-26 festive season, JEDCO announced that its service centres in Juba would remain open on public holidays to meet increased demand with toll free customer support and emergency response teams operating throughout the period.

== Ownership and governance ==
The company is jointly owned by Ezra Construction & Development Group Ltd. which holds a 52 percent stake and the South Sudan Electricity Corporation which owns 48 percent.

== Tariffs and regulation ==
JEDCO's tariffs are regulated in coordination with government authorities. In 2025, electricity prices were reduced following regulatory and presidential directives to improve affordability.

== Technology and services ==
JEDCO supports digital electricity token purchases through mobile money platforms, reducing reliance on cash transactions.

== See also ==
- South Sudan Electricity Corporation
