= Augustino Jadalla Wani =

South Sudanese politician

Gen.Augustino Jadalla Wani (born 26 June 1963);Augustino Jada Wani, is a South Sudanese politician who served as the deputy minister of interior and wildlife conservation (2013–2015) and later as the governor of the now defunct Jubek State.(2015–2020)

He was appointed and served as the governor of Jubek State, South Sudan, on 24 December 2015. He was the first and only governor of the state, which was created by President Salva Kiir on 2 October 2015.

== Early life and personal life ==
Jadalla was born on June 26, 1963, to Bari parents in Mankaro, which is located in Mongalla Payam, Juba County. His father is from Billinyang Village which is located East from Juba. He was the first born to his parents and was born into a religious Christian family of the Catholic faith. His father, Kamilo Wani, was a catechist at a Roman Catholic church in Mongalla, and this is where Jadalla was able to find his rooting. He acquired the name "Jadalla", which was derived from Jada from the Muslim-dominated capital of Sudan, Khartoum, when the Muslim populace he associated with tried to convert him into Islam and thus presented him with the name Jadalla.

Jadalla is member of the Christian faith. He has children around the world pursuing multiple studies some in cities like Tel Aviv, Nairobi, Toronto, Kampala among other world renowned universities

== Education ==
Jadalla Wani started his education from Mongalla Elementary Primary school in 1968, then later joined Buluk Junior Secondary School in 1975 and finished his Senior Secondary School from Loka Senior Secondary School in 1980.

Jadalla then enrolled at Wadi Sayyidna Military College (Wadi Seidna) where he attained the Sudan Military College Certificate. He further attained trainings from Gibet Infantry School, Omdurman Senior Staff College and Institute of Infantry Kereri. (Wadi Sayyidna)

== Military services and politics ==
Jadalla graduated from Wadi Sayyidna Military College (Wadi Seidna) as an officer in 1983 where he served under the Sudan Armed Forces until 1992.

He then joined the Sudan People's Liberation Army (SPLA) in 1992 where he played an active role in the independence struggle for South Sudan. He served as a Commander in various units and is most notable in the capture Yei from the Sudan Armed Forces.

He further participated in the IGAD Peace Talks that were held in Naivasha, Kenya between June 2004 to January, 2005. Jadalla served as the Director of Finance of the SPLA at the Headquarters in Bilpam from 2006 up to 2010.

He was then made the Division Commander of Division 2 which had its headquarters in Mogiri. He served this position for 2 years until 2012 when he was relieved off duty.

Jadalla was then appointed as the Governor of Jubek State, South Sudan on 24 December 2015 as the first and only Governor of the now defunct Jubek State.

Jadalla served as governor of Eastern Equatoria State from 2 May 2024 to 16 June 2025, when he was removed by President Kiir.
