= Koda River (South Sudan) =

The Koda River, locally called Khor Koda, is a seasonal tributary of the White Nile in the state of Jubek, South Sudan.

== Course ==
The river begins approximately at 4.687°N 31.063°E, south of the Miri Hills, approximately 7 km north of the village of Mussikidolk and 60 km west of the state capital Juba. It runs mostly in the northeast direction, being joined by major tributaries from the same general source region at 4.7554°N 31.1012°E and 4.8564°N 31.1769°E. Near 5.080°N 31.312°E it changes to an eastward general direction. After about 32 km (beeline; near 5.047°N 31.604°E, about 20 km due north of Juba, and 6 km northwest of Luala) it makes a broad curve 6 km south and southeast of Mount Lado, an isolated hill with peak at 1006 m altitude, that dominates the landscape of the area.

From there it flows northeast for about 14 km, almost parallel to the White Nile, until a point 0.5 southwest of the village of Lado Koda (5.139°N 31.709°E). There the course bends sharply to the southwest for another 2.5 km, ending on the White Nile, about 35 km downstream (north) of Juba 5.1302°N 31.7286°E. The annual flow has been estimated at 60 million m^{3}.

For the last 18 km, the river is flanked by a strip of floodplains about 0.5 km wide, with a total area of 3159 ha, including the riverbed. Along that valley, the altitude drops from 470 m (at 5.047°N 31.604°E) to 435 m.

The river flows near the villages of Wulikare, Logogvi, Ludo Kenyi, Luala, and Lado Koda. Wulikare is located 0.5 km south of the river and 29 km northwest of Juba.

== History and demographics ==
The area near the White Nile is the historic homeland of Bari-speaking people.

The Nyangwara tribe in the Miri Hills, Mongalla province believed that Lotome, the first remembered ancestor of the Gwokorongo chiefs, lived at Dogeleng near the Koda River around 1800.

As of 2018, the South Sudan war was still affecting in the area.

== Economics ==
As of 2012, only about 10% of the area in the flood valley was cultivated, mostly for maize, sorghum, cassava and millet.

As in most of South Sudan, the local population among the poorest in the planet. The area has been of interest to international relief agencies that produced plans for possible irrigation projects or actually created and managed such installations and model farms. For example, the Japan International Cooperation Agency (JICA) offered a study of the construction of three dams—including one on the Koda river, a couple km west of Wulikare—to collect and store water for irrigation in the region of Jalang.

== Flora and fauna ==
Much of the area has natural vegetation consisting of grasses, bushes, and sparse trees.

== See also ==
- Luri River, South Sudan
- Lori River, South Sudan
