= Mount Lado (South Sudan) =

Mountain in South Sudan

Coordinates: 5.1024°N 31.5846°E

Mount Lado or Jebel Lado is an isolated hillock in Central Equatoria, South Sudan, about 13 km northwest of the White Nile and 28 km due north of the national capital Juba. The mountain was also called Mount Nyerkenyi.

The current name comes from Lado-lo-Möri, the Bari chief who controlled the surrounding area when British governor Charles George Gordon founded Lado, on the West Nile bank southeast of the mountain, as the capital of the Central Equatoria province.

The hill rises about 500 m above the flat alluvial plain to a peak altitude of 1006 meters, and dominates the landscape, being the only hill in a radius of 30 km (the nearest one being Jebel Kunufi to the southwest, with peak at 871 m). The hill is almond-shaped, about 4.7 km long and 3.6 km wide, with the long axis oriented north by northeast. The Koda River runs about 3 km south and 5 km southwest of its base. It is surrounded by several small villages, including Ludo Kenyi and Rombe Lako.
