= David Lokonga Moses =

Governor of Yei River State, South Sudan

David Lokonga Moses has been the governor of Yei River State, South Sudan since 24 December 2015. He is the first governor of the state, which was created by President Salva Kiir on 2 October 2015.

He has served as Commissioner of Yei County, Central Equatoria from 2005 to 2011.
