= Kajo Keji =

- Town
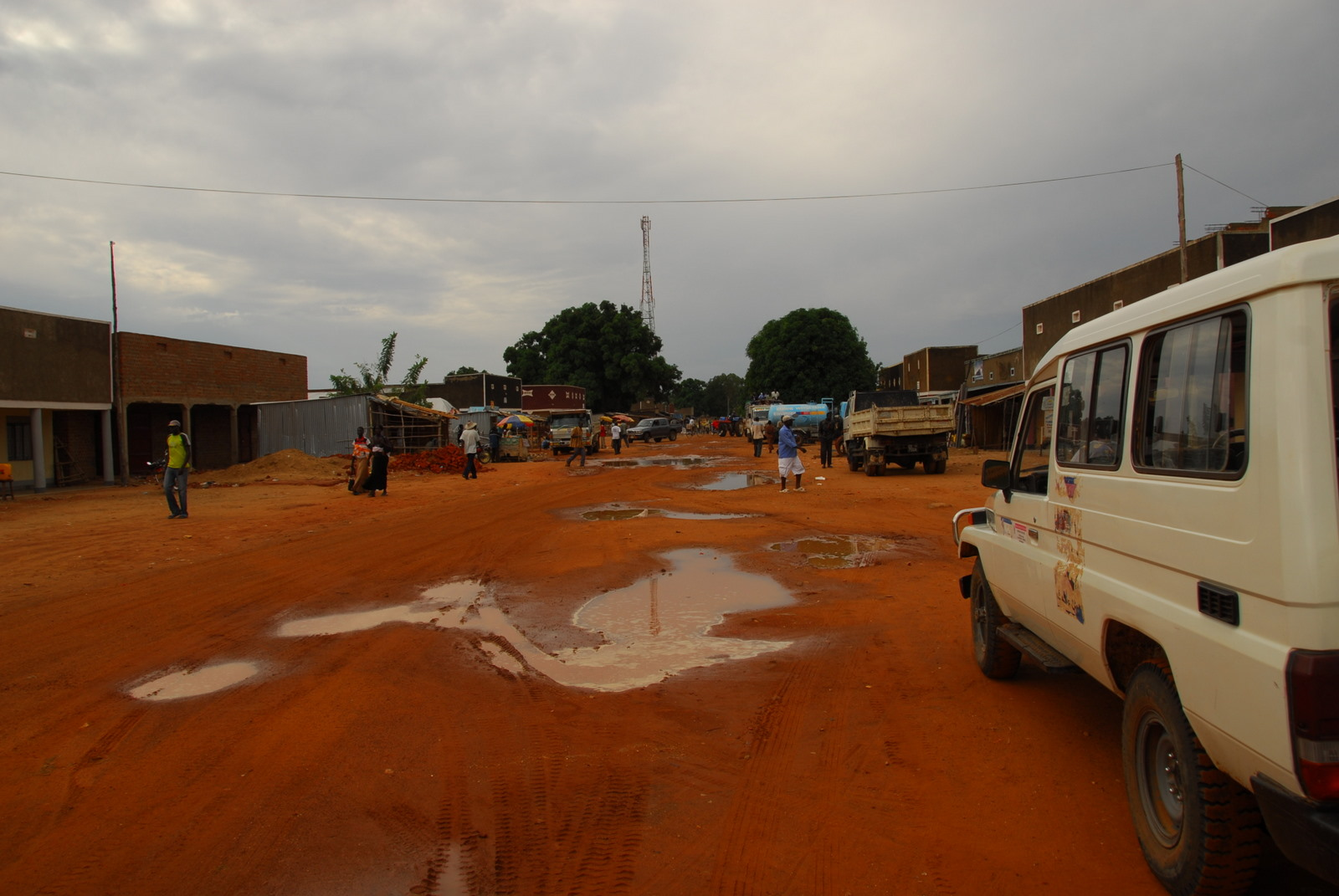

- Location in South Sudan
- Coordinates: 03°50′57″N 31°39′28″E
- Country: South Sudan
- Region: Equatoria
- State: Central Equatoria
- County: Kajo Keji County
- Time zone: UTC+2 (CAT)
- Climate: Aw

Kajo Keji, also spelled Kajokaji, Kajukeji, Kajo-keji and Kago Kaju, is a town in South Sudan.

== Location ==
Kajo Keji is in Kajo Keji County of Central Equatoria (one of the ten states of South Sudan). It is approximately 150 kilometres (93 mi), by road, south of Juba, the capital of and largest city in South Sudan. It lies near the border with Eastern Equatoria State and close to the international border with Uganda, to the south. The town of Nimule lies approximately 50 kilometres (31 mi) by road southeast of Kajo Keji, at the point where the Victoria Nile leaves Uganda to enter South Sudan.

== Overview ==
Kajo Keji and the surrounding community are home to the Kuku people. The town is home to the headquarters of the Anglican Diocese of Kajo Keji, with Bishop Lule James Kenyi being the prelate. Equity Bank South Sudan Limited maintains a branch in the town, being the only commercial bank in the county.

== Climate ==
Located at an elevation of 957.32 meters (3140.81 feet) above sea level, Kajo Kaji has a Tropical wet and dry or savanna climate (Classification: Aw). The district's yearly temperature is 31.5°C (88.7°F) and it is 2.0% higher than South Sudan's averages. Kajo Kaji typically receives about 138.97 millimeters (5.47 inches) of precipitation and has 210.66 rainy days (57.72% of the time) annually.

Climate data for Kajo Keji
Month	Jan	Feb	Mar	Apr	May	Jun	Jul	Aug	Sep	Oct	Nov	Dec	Year
Record high °C (°F)	44.8 (112.6)	45.8 (114.4)	45.8 (114.4)	44.8 (112.6)	42.6 (108.7)	40.5 (104.9)	42.6 (108.7)	41.6 (106.9)	42.6 (108.7)	43.7 (110.7)	41.6 (106.9)	42.6 (108.7)	45.8 (114.4)
Mean daily maximum °C (°F)	39.5 (103.1)	39.8 (103.6)	37.9 (100.2)	35.3 (95.5)	33.9 (93.0)	33 (91)	33.5 (92.3)	34.28 (93.70)	34.9 (94.8)	36.02 (96.84)	32.6 (90.7)	38.11 (100.60)	36.45 (97.61)
Daily mean °C (°F)	33.7 (92.7)	35.2 (95.4)	34.8 (94.6)	29.4 (84.9)	32.8 (91.0)	29.4 (84.9)	29.3 (84.7)	28.4 (83.1)	29.4 (84.9)	31.3 (88.3)	30.1 (86.2)	33 (91)	31.4 (88.5)
Mean daily minimum °C (°F)	25 (77)	26.9 (80.4)	27.8 (82.0)	20.1 (68.2)	24.2 (75.6)	22.9 (73.2)	22 (72)	22 (72)	22.3 (72.1)	23.3 (73.9)	24.4 (75.9)	25.3 (77.5)	24.4 (75.9)
Record low °C (°F)	17.0 (62.6)	22.4 (72.3)	15.4 (59.7)	22.4 (72.3)	20.2 (68.4)	19.2 (66.6)	16.0 (60.8)	19.2 (66.6)	19.2 (66.6)	19.2 (66.6)	21.3 (70.3)	20.2 (68.4)	16 (61)
Average precipitation mm (inches)	5.6 (0.22)	28.3 (1.11)	58.2 (2.29)	99.1 (3.90)	220.8 (8.69)	236.8 (9.32)	227.1 (8.94)	248 (9.8)	215 (8.5)	215.5 (8.48)	96.5 (3.80)	16.3 (0.64)	138.9 (5.47)
Average precipitation days (≥ 1.0 mm)	1.55	5.43	10.77	17.26	24.83	26.67	28.42	29.09	25.13	23.86	13.68	3.98	17.55
Average relative humidity (%)	28.3	29.9	41.4	56.9	71.9	80.2	80.7	77.5	72.8	59.6	38.4	59.6	59.6

== See also ==
- Transport in South Sudan
