= Kajo Keji County =

- County
- Location in South Sudan
- Country: South Sudan
- State: Central Equatoria
- Headquarters: Kajo Keji
- Time zone: UTC+2 (CAT)

Kajo Keji County is an administrative area in Central Equatoria, South Sudan.

Phanuel Dumo is the Commissioner of Kajo Keji County who replaced the SPLM-IO nominated Commissioner Kenyi Eresto Michael as decreed by President Salva Kiir in November 2021 upon recommendation from Central Equatoria State Governor Emmanuel Adil Anthony.

== Demography ==
Demographics of Kajo Keji County
2008 population census	340,387
2024 Population projection*	450,902
Major ethnic groups	The Kuku
Languages	Kuku
Displacement Figures	67,273 IDPS and 133,671 returnees (Q1 2020)
Religion	Roman Catholic, Anglican Church, Presbyterian, Pentecost Christianity and small number of Islam.

== Economy and Livelihoods ==
Central Equatoria State is where Kajo-Keji County is found. It shares borders with Juba County in the north, Lainya County in the west, Magwi County in the east (which is part of Eastern Equatoria State), and Uganda in the south. In the east of the county, the hills and mountains of the Nyiri range separate Kajo-Keji from the White Nile.

FEWSNET (2018) says that Kajo-Keji County is in the area where people live off of maize and cassava. According to a 2013 IOM assessment, most people live off of subsistence farming (39%) and raising livestock (39%) and a small number also fish (6%). The county has a lot of land that can be used for farming and a lot of potential for agricultural growth. Cassava, sorghum, groundnuts, and maize are the crops that are grown the most. Since 2016, conflict and insecurity have had a big effect on the livelihoods and economic stability of the country, making the people there more vulnerable. In recent years, the presence of migrating cattle herds has caused problems with the local people that don't seem to be getting better. At least twice in early 2015, people from Kajo-Keji fought with Bor Dinka cattle keepers and the SPLA soldiers who were with them over the destruction of crops and competition for grazing land (HRW, 2017). In an IOM survey from 2013, livestock herders in Kajo-Keji said that disease was the biggest problem for their way of life (22%), followed by lack of market facilities (20%) and water (19%). Also, 17% said that conflict and 15% said that grazing land were problems. The insecurity on the roads that lead from Kajo-Keji to other major markets, like Juba, has also made it harder for people to make a living.

IPC's predictions range from crisis (January 2020) to emergency (May–July 2020). (February–April 2020). This is a big change from early 2016, when arable land, closeness to the international market (for example, high-quality seed imports), and a lack of large-scale violence kept food insecurity in the county to a low level. In 2016, conflict caused more people to leave the county and the areas around it. This led to more food insecurity and less resilience in the area, making it one of the most vulnerable counties.

== Infrastructure and Services ==
Lire Payam is where the county government of Kajo-Keji is based. Before the conflict started in 2016, Kajo-Keji was seen as a model county in terms of its growth and stability. The diaspora helped build its infrastructure, and the town of Kajo-Keji had schools and medical facilities. Since the conflict started in 2016, a lot of the infrastructure has been damaged or left empty, and it will take a lot of work to fix it so that it can serve the people again. In 2019, Kajo-Keji was named as one of the most important border towns in South Sudan that would get electricity from a dam in Uganda, which would be paid for by the African Development Bank. Since 2018, when the political and security situation in South Sudan improved, some development projects were able to get back on track, but the status of this project was not known to the public as of early 2020.

OCHA's 2019 Humanitarian Needs Overview for 2020 says that about 54% of the projected population of Kajo-Keji, or 119,300 people, have significant humanitarian needs. The Resilience Capacity Index found that the county was one of the six with the least ability to bounce back after a disaster (OCHA 2019, p. 21).

== Conflict Dynamics ==
Kajo-Keji was mostly spared from the large-scale violence caused by the national conflict in 2013. However, the second outbreak of conflict in 2016 had a big effect on the area. The county has seen a lot of people move away and feel unsafe, which has made it hard for people to make a living there. People who had to leave Kajo-Keji mostly went to Uganda. Before 2016, there were always fights between different groups, and it wasn't always clear why. Due to a lack of police resources and good legal infrastructure, it has been hard to solve problems through the legal system.

Also, the demarcation of the border between the Kuku community and the Moyo community in neighbouring Uganda is still a source of tension. In September 2014, a fight broke out over land rights, killing dozens of people on both sides of the border (UNMISS, 2015).

Even though the security situation has gotten better since the peace agreement was signed in 2018, a lot of the population is still living in other places, and IDPs and refugees can't go home because of occasional security problems.

== Administration and Logistics ==
There are five payams in Kajo Keji County namely; Lire (County Headquarters), Kangapo I, Kangapo II, Liwolo, and Nyepo.

Here are some of the roads from Kajo Keji county; the primary road northwards to Juba County was allocated “road warnings” in both the rainy and dry season in 2019 – sustained insecurity along the road has led to the deterioration of conditions. Primary road west to Yei County has access challenges during the rainy season, but is open to vehicles in the dry season. Conditions of primary road southwards to Uganda is unknown.

A secondary road runs east to Eastern Equatoria State, with the closest town being Pageri, Magwi County. The road is passable only in the dry season, and conditions for specific vehicles are unknown.
