= Lainya County =

- County
- Country: South Sudan
- State: Central Equatoria

Government
  - Commissioner: Emmanuel Khamis Richard (Sudan People's Liberation Movement (SPLM))

Population (2020)
  - Total: 110,282
- Time zone: UTC+2 (CAT)

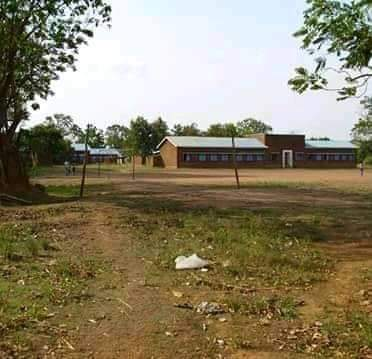
LOKA ROUND SECONDARY SCHOOL.the only national secondary school in lainya county

Lainya is a county in Central Equatoria State, South Sudan. Hon Robert John Lasu is the current commissioner of Lainya County after seven commissioner's,

== Administration and Logistics ==
the importations Administration areas in lainya county are basically in payams and boma.

payams.

1. Lainya payam.
2. Kenyi payam.
3. Kupera payam.
4. Mukaya payam.
5. Wuji payam.

Roads: Lainya is situated on the main road that connects Juba to the northeast and Yei to the southwest. "Road warnings" are usually issued when road conditions deteriorate during the rainy season. A secondary road connects Lainya to Jambo town in Mundri East County.

=== Bomas of lainya county ===
- Wuji Boma.
- Dongoro Boma.
- Koyoki Boma.
- Logwili Boma
- Lokurubang Boma.
- Bereka boms.
- Loka West boms.
- Limbe boma.

== Peace and security ==
Lainya County has been affected by the civil war between Sudanese People's Liberation Army/Movement (SPLA) and the National Congress Party (NCP) of the Sudanese government. Lainya had been bombed by planes and artillery of the Sudanese government against the SPLA/M rebels during the war.

Following the outbreak of conflict in South Sudan in 2016, The National Salvation Front (NAS), a rebel faction led by Thomas Cirillo, has been causing havoc in the area, killing tens of people and displacing hundred others.

== Background ==
The Lainya County is located in Central Equatoria State of the Republic of South Sudan. Lainya Town the seat of county administration is located 101 km from Juba and 60 km from Yei County. Business people, tourists and all travelling vehicles from Yei to Juba and Juba to Yei stop for their breakfast in Lainya Town, which is the only area with high level of development on the road. The successive Commissioners of Lainya County (in chronological order of their time in office, Samuel Suba, Colonel Vincent Kujo Lobung, Tereka Sadaraka, Huda Mika Laila, Stephen Yatta and Emmanuel Khamis Richard, were all appointed officials by the President of South Sudan on recommendation of the state governor.

== Demographics ==
It is bordered by Yei River County to the west, Morobo County to the south-west, Kajo-Keji County and Uganda to the South, Juba County to the east and north-east and Mundri County to the North. It is administratively divided into six sub-counties or Payams, namely; Kenyi, Kupera, Lainya, Mukaya and Wuji. Two inter-city/inter-county roads or highways pass through Lainya County and meet at Lainya Town, namely; Juba-Yei Road and Lainya-Jambo Road. Both roads have the potential of becoming important national highways/freeways.

== History ==
=== Civil War ===
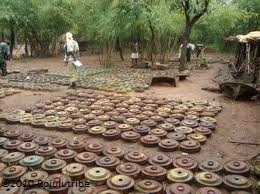
IEDs collected by NGOs in Lainya County 2003-07

The Sudanese Army advanced in the south, reaching the southern borders with neighboring Kenya and Uganda. The campaign started in 1989 and ended in 1994. During the fight the situation worsened in the tribal south causing casualties among the Christian and animist minority. During the control of Lainya by Sudanese government thousands of Improvised explosive devices or IED where planted all around the roads, village paths and farmlands. All of those IEDs where collected after the signing of CPA in 2005. Some of the IEDs were unable to be removed and the only choice was to destroy by explosion.

The war went on for more than 20 years, including the use of Russian-made combat helicopters and military cargo planes which were used as bombers to devastating effect on villages and tribal rebels alike. The war displaced an estimated four million people (of a total estimated population of thirty-two million); and killed an estimated two million people. It damaged Sudan's economy and led to food shortages, resulting in starvation and malnutrition. The lack of investment during this time, particularly in the south, meant a generation lost access to basic health services, education, and jobs. Lainya is one of the ruined county in Sudanese civic war. Its geographical location has been on the target of every war. Also the government was keen in Lainya for its resources particular teaks, which led to deafforestation of many plantations in the area of Loka during the war.

=== Development ===
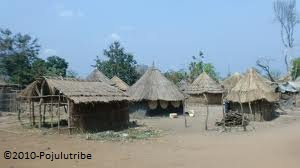
Tukuls of IDPs by LRA rebels in Lainya County 2008-09

Lainya county has been affected by the huge devastation of 21 years of civil war, which makes it hard to develop. Therefore, even three years after the end of the war, the people's lives are threatened by the innumerable neglected landmines and unexploded bombshells that remain hidden. Education in the region has been very hard, children are studying under trees which actually shows how much of the region has been destroyed. Many teak trees in Africa's largest teak plantation (Loka West) near. Loka round have been destroyed by guns and deforestation has been carried out illegally, due to the lack of control when the region was under SPLA/M rebels and Sudanese soldiers. It makes it hard for the local Chief to have control on his region. Earlier in 2007-09 the notorious Lord Resistance Army known as LRA has extend their operation into the area causing thousands of civilians to flee their homes for safety. Most of the people in rural areas moved to Lainya central business building and starting building local shelters for the short time protection. Those Internally displaced person IDP some are currently living in the area while others have returned to places.

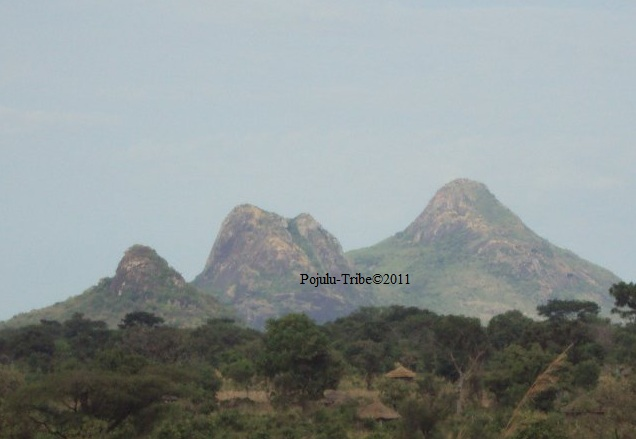
Gumbiri Mountain in Lainya County.

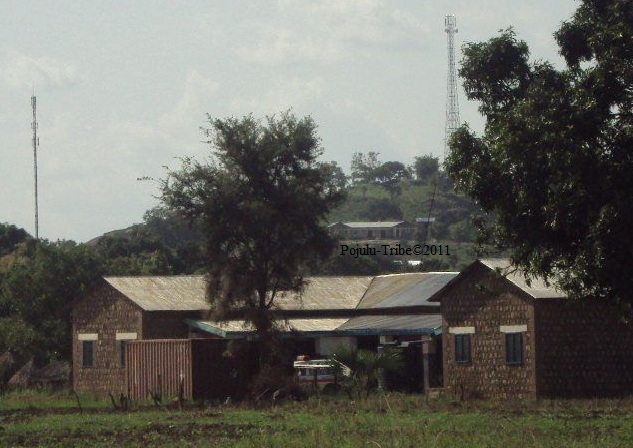
Lainya Hospital in Lainya County

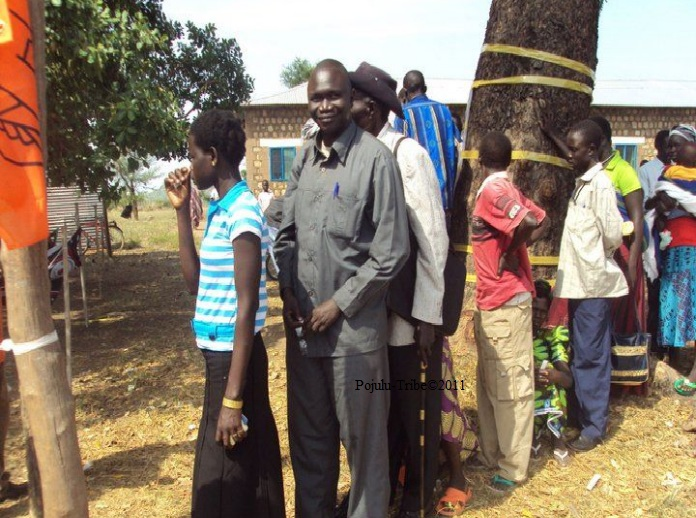
2011 Referendum Voting in Lainya County.

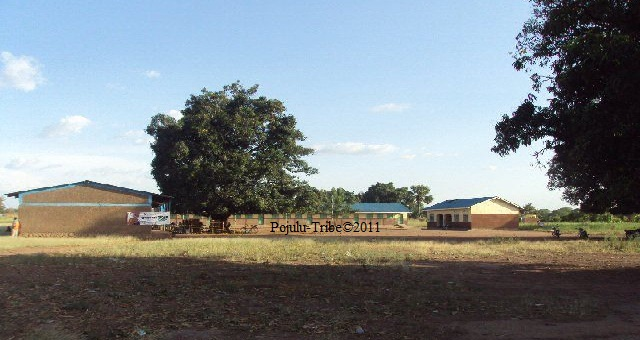
Bereka Primary School in Lainya County.

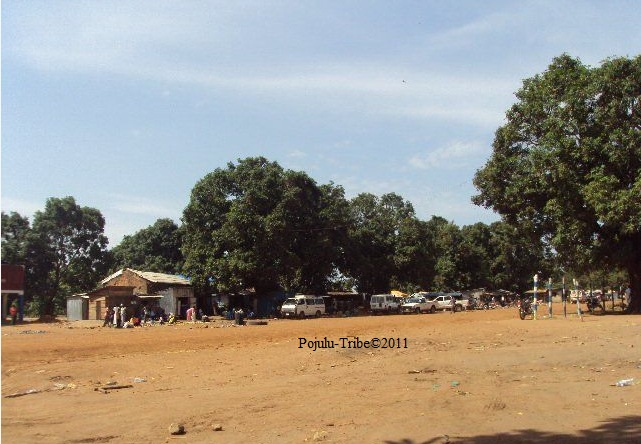
Lainya Taxi Parking in Lainya County

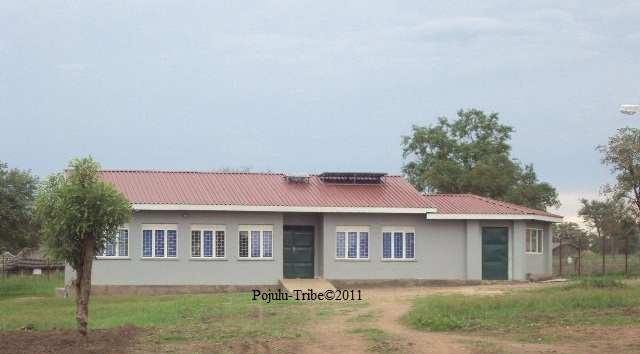
St Luke Private Clinic in Lainya County.

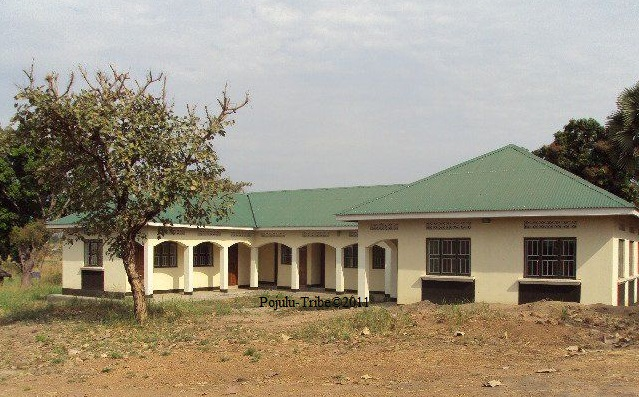
LVTI Administrative Block in progress

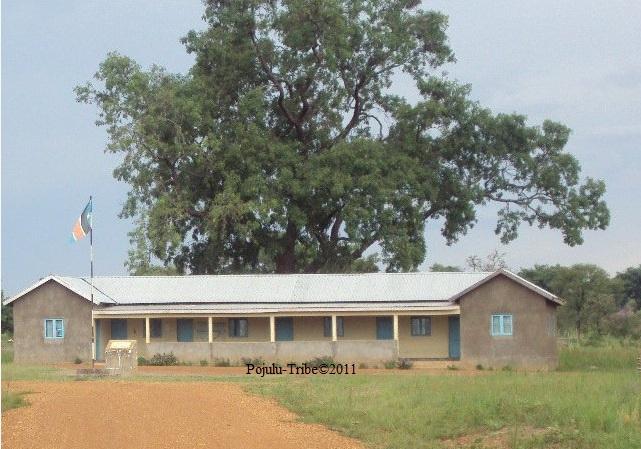
Lainya Payam headquarters

=== As part of Yei River State ===
Lainya County became a part of Yei River State after the creation of new states was decreed by the President Salva Kiir. The county was divided into three counties in April 2016 with the two new counties Kupera and Wuji being carved from part of its area.

== Lainya market ==
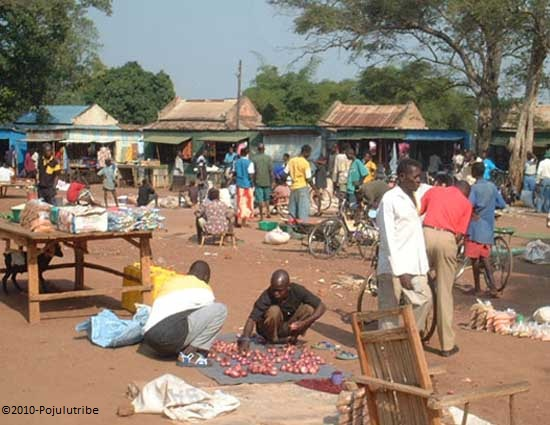
Lainya supermarket in November 2009

Lainya Market is located in the heart of Lainya Central Business building and hosts a number of businesses. Operating since 1998 perhaps since 1990 under Sudanese Government, the market provides a vibrant, diverse people from neighbouring counties. The market attracts a range of customers from local shoppers visitors and tourists from Juba, Keji Keji, Morobu and Yei. Visitors come to the market for items that cannot be found in conventional supermarkets and shopping centres across other counties in Central Equatoria.

== Environment ==
Lainya has a healthy environment in comparison to other counties in South Sudan. Air quality is generally good; however woodsmoke from fireplaces is an issue in the winter months. Lainya waterways have historically been affected by heavy pollution from aerial bombs dropped by the army of the then Government of Sudan during the civil war of between the Sudan Government and rebels of the SPLM. There are no national parks in Lainya; Lainya is bordered by extensive bushland to the far west, east and south sensitive rock lands to the west. There are a number of nearby Mount Park including the Gumbiri Mt, Loka Mt, Biri peak, Kero, Bereka, Gwasere, Lang-koda, Tuli, Arabi, Mondoru'da, Kilingwara, Jolobong, Lukurubang, Kopido, Ka'buu, Kenyi and Baraka peak.

== Transport ==
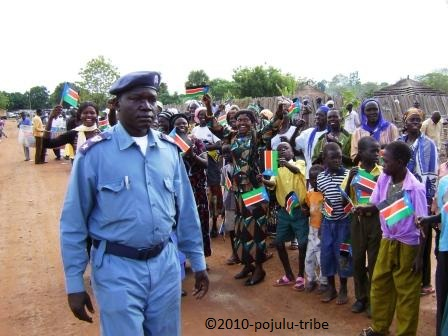
A police officer in Lainya county

The main mode of transport in Lainya is the road network and the automobile. The Juba road connects Lainya to Yei River County and also to the regional capital city of South Sudan. Lainya is only served by extensive private buses, taxis; motorcycles, trucks and Lorries currently operated along the Juba-Yei road.

== Education ==
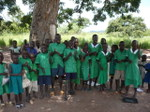
Pupils under tree in Lainya County, Southern Sudan 2003

Pupils learn under mango trees, because the region requires much development due to the devastation by the SPLA/M - South Sudan People's Liberation Army/ Movement and NCP. The picture shows some of the local classes for the children who are mostly struggling for their education on the countrysides of Lainya county. Most of the teachers use what they have learnt "off head" without using books, not because they don't want to, but because there are no books, in some other parts of Equatoria, teachers are relying on East Africa books particularly from Uganda and Kenya which may help in common areas like science, mathematics and English, but when coming into Geography it is hard to use this is particularly due to the difference in the syllabi.

== Schools in Lainya County ==
=== Secondaries Schools ===
1. Loka round secondary school.
2. Holly cross secondary school.

primaries school

1. lainya primary school.
2. Samson primary school.
3. Holly cross primary school.
4. Logwile primary school.
5. Bereka primary school.
6. Lokurubang primary school.
7. Loka round primary school.
8. Loka West primary school.
9. Makaro primary school.
10. Kenyi primary school.

== Economic activities ==
Subsistence agriculture as well as cattle rearing are some of the common and the main economic activities in the county, as is the case with most Sudanesecounties. Crops grown include.

- Millet
- Sweet potatoes
- Beans
- Cassava
- cowpeas
- Tomatoes
- Papaya
- ground nut
- Mangos
- Oranges
- Lemons
- Onions
- Simsim
- Banana
- Maize
- Okra
- Honey
- Sorghum
- coffee

== See also ==
- Central Equatoria
- Juba, Sudan
- Mukaya Payam
- Pojulu Tribe
- Yei
