= Keliko people =

Keliko
Total population
- 61,000

Regions with significant populations
- South Sudan: 27,000
- DR Congo: 21,000
- Uganda: 13,000

Languages
- Keliko

Religion
- Christianity and animism

Related ethnic groups
- Lugbara, Madi

The Keliko or Kaliko are an ethnic group in South Sudan and the Democratic Republic of the Congo, with immigrant communities in Uganda. In the Democratic Republic of the Congo, they are called Kaliko umi, and live in areas like Laibo, Mado, Awubha Awuzi. In South Sudan, Keliko people live in Lújúlē and Ūdábī payams west of Morobo County, Central Equatoria State and in Ūmbãci in Yei County.

The Keliko people speak the Keliko language, which is a Central Sudanic language. Traditionally animists, the Keliko have largely converted to Christianity. They have a motto that says trú álõ bã 'orá, which means "together we can".

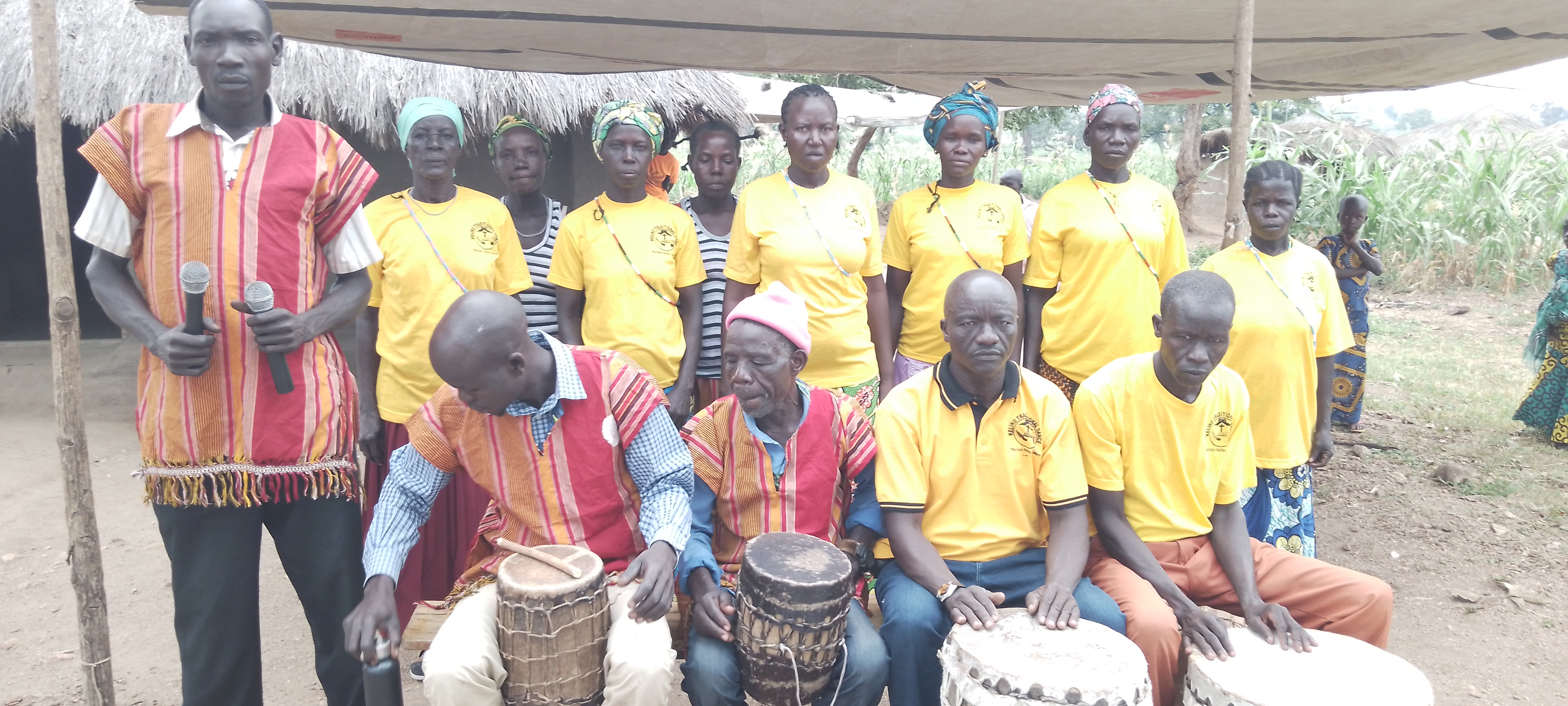
Keliko cultural dance team

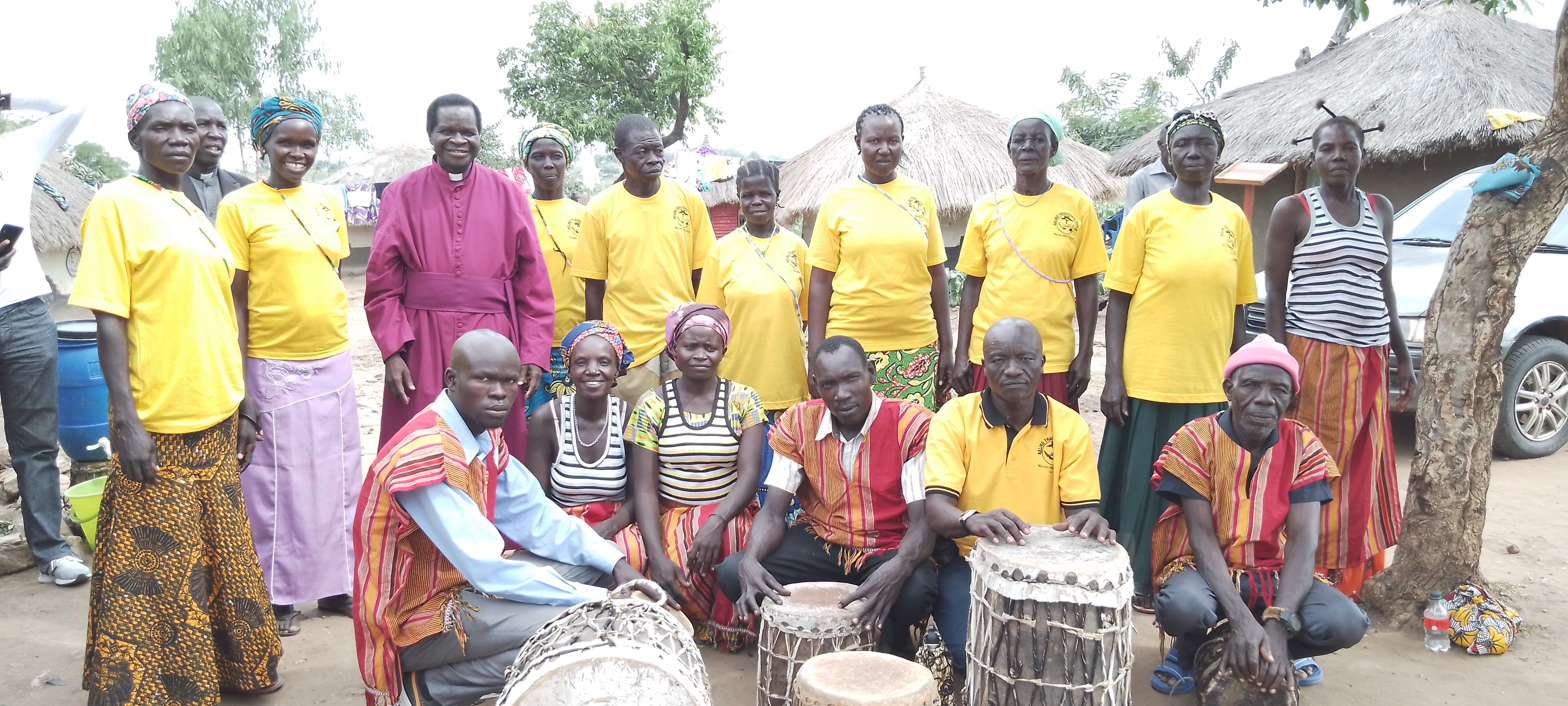

== Culture and society ==
The Keliko have a rich cultural heritage that includes traditional music, dance, and folklore. Their social structure is typically organized around clans and extended families, with elders playing a crucial role in community decision-making and the preservation of traditions. They use instruments such as drums, harps, and flutes to create rhythmic and melodic sounds that reflect their cultural identity.

The Keliko people are people of hospitality and generosity in the region. They are described as having a strong sense of community and often come together for important events such as weddings, funerals, and religious celebrations.

The Keliko people have faced challenges in recent years due to conflict and displacement. However, they continue to preserve their cultural heritage and maintain their traditional way of life despite these difficulties.

=== Livelihood ===
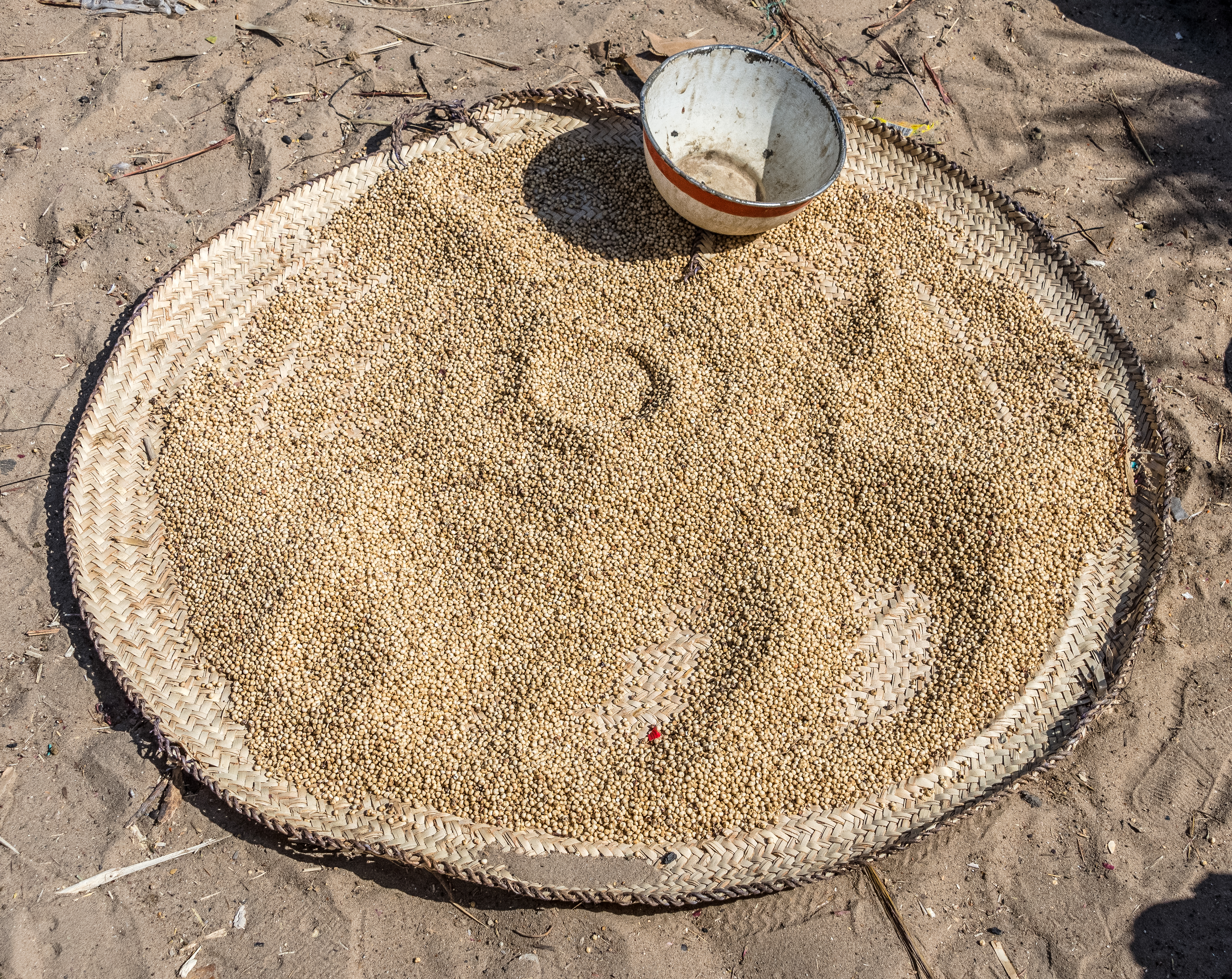
Vending of millet on a tray

The Keliko primarily engage in subsistence farming, growing crops such as maize, millet, sorghum, and cassava. They also practice animal husbandry, hunting and fishing. These activities are essential for their sustenance and economic stability.

== Keliko Language ==
The Keliko speak the Keliko language, which belongs to the Nilo-Saharan language family, specifically the Central Sudanic group. The language is an integral part of their cultural identity and is used in daily communication, traditional rituals, and oral literature.

== Religion ==
The traditional religion of the Keliko involves a belief in a supreme deity and various spirits associated with nature. However, following missionary activities in the region, Christianity constitutes the majority faith.

The Wycliffe Bible translators, in the Fall of 2018, gave and dedicated to the Keliko people a translation of the New Testament in their own language. There were 1,000 translated New Testaments distributed.
