= Yei River County =

Yei Small London
- County
- Yei River County
- Nickname: Small London
- Central Equatoria State Counties

- Location in South Sudan
- Country: South Sudan
- State: Central Equatoria
- Headquarters: Yei

Government
  - Type: Unity Government
  - Commissioner: Aggrey Cyrus Kanyikwa

Population (2020)
  - Total: 271,197
- Time zone: UTC+2 (CAT)

Yei River County is an administrative area in Central Equatoria with a large population of people who settled in that particular county.

Aggrey Cyrus Kanyikwa is the current commissioner for Yei River County. He was appointed by President Salva Kiir as recommended by former Central Equatoria State Governor, Emmanuel Adil Anthony.

Yei has had many communities including the Pojulu, kakwa, Mundu etc., Welcoming businessmen and investors as it grows.

== Demographics ==
Demographics of Yei River County
2008 Census population	201,443
2020 Population projection*	271,197
Major ethnic groups and languages	Pojulu, Kakwa, Keliko, Makaraka, Mundu, Avok’aya, Baka
Displacement Figures: IDPS	67,511
Displacement Figures: Returnees	10,097
Number of Payams	05

Yei River County is divided into smaller sub-regions (payams). As of January 2023, there are five payams: the Yei Town payam, the Otogo payam, the Mugwo payam, the Tore payam, and the Lasu payam.The county was divided into four counties in April 2016, however, in 2020 the divided counties were all reverted and merged into Greater Yei River County as follows below:

1. Lainya
2. Morobo
3. Kajo-keji

== Yei River County Payams ==
Mukaya Payam

1-Dimu togeleng (D1)

2-Dimu tomurek(D2)

=== Mugwo Payam ===
Mountains in mugwo payaam

1-Mugwo mountain

2. Longamere Mountain

=== Lasu payam ===
1 Tokori boma 2 Asole boma 3 Lasu boma 4 Jabara boma newly established

== Tribes under Lasu Payam ==
- Kakwa
- Keliko
- Pojulu in Tokori boma

== Geography, economy, and humanitarian status ==
Yei River County is located in the state of Central Equatoria. It is bordered to the east by Lainya County, to the south by Morobo County, and to the north by Western Equatoria State (Maridi and Mundri West Counties). It shares a long western border with the Democratic Republic of the Congo. The county is distinguished by hills and dense forest cover. Several rivers, including the River Yei, flow north through the county in the western and eastern parts.

The county is located in the equatorial maize and cassava livelihoods zone, according to FEWSNET (2018). According to an FAO and WFP report from 2018, 30% of the county's households depended on small scale agriculture (p. 19). Furthermore, Yei County's soil and climate due to climatic changes, is not as an ideal location for agricultural activities as before. Following the outbreak of conflict in 2016 and climatic changes, Yei County experienced one of the country's largest drops in harvested areas, with the county's cereal harvest dropping from surplus to deficit. Before 2016, Yei had a high incoming population from neighboring states and countries. The presence of the Yei River in the area also allows residents to pursue fishing as a source of little diet, though access is limited due to extended periods of insecurity in the area.

According to IPC projections, the county had Minimal (IPC Phase 1) levels of food insecurity in 2016. However, due to the second outbreak of conflict in South Sudan, IPC projects classified the country as being in Crisis (IPC Phase 3) for the first half of the year. Insecurity in the county limited farmers' access to land and also hampered trade routes, which were critical for small businesses to survive.

According to OCHA's (2019) Humanitarian Needs Overview for 2020, there are approximately 224,000 people in the country who have significant humanitarian needs, including IDPs. This corresponds to approximately 83% of the HNO's estimated population. Because of access issues, humanitarian organizations were unable to provide critical services to many vulnerable populations in Yei County in 2019, exacerbating the population's humanitarian needs. The county's protection needs were described as "catastrophic," with one of the highest levels of contamination of landmines/explosive remnants of war (ERW), gender-based violence, and child protection concerns in the country.

== Schools in Yei River County ==
=== Secondary Schools ===
- Yei day Secondary school
- Midland secondary school
- St. Joseph Lutaya secondary school
- Kinji Secondary School
- Immanuel Model secondary school
- Yei public Secondary school
- Kings College
- Excel Academy Secondary School
- Nile High Secondary School
- EPC Nehemiah Secondary School
- St. Paul Secondary School
- Yei girls' senior secondary school
- Days star secondary school
- Green Secondary school
- Rash secondary school
- Brilliant secondary school
- prince of peace high secondary school

=== Primary Schools ===
- Immanuel Model primary school
- Lutaya primary school
- Lomuku primary school
- Mahat primary school
- Kinji primary school
- Jigomoni primary school
- Rwonyi primary school
- Kanjoro primary school
- Midland Academy Nursery & Primary School
- Nyongwe Primary school
- kololo primary school
- EPC Nehemiah primary school
- Lizira primary school
- Lupapa primary school
- Christ The king primary school
- St Cicilia primary school
- Wuluturu primary school
- CCM primary school
- St James primary school
- New Generation primary school
- Salam primary school
- Marakonye primary school
- Hope primary school

Top Performing Private/Church funded Primary Schools in Yei River County, CES - South Sudan irrespective of the order.

- Midland Academy Nursery & Primary School - Private
- Narrow Gate - Private
- EPC Harvesters Primary School - Church funded
- Immanuel Model Primary School - Church funded
- Spirit Primary School - Private
- Light House Primary School - Private
- Christ the King Primary School - Church funded
- EPC Nehemiah Primary School - Church funded

== Administration ==
The county's administrative center is in Yei Town Payam. Yei River County is on South Sudan's southern border, connecting it to trade routes through Uganda and the Democratic Republic of the Congo. Following independence, Yei River County was regarded as a stable area with significant development in terms of government institutions, educational facilities, and healthcare. However, sustained insecurity in the area, as well as in neighboring counties, has had a significant impact on all of these, and insecurity along the Juba-Yei road has impacted trade routes that support the economy. Due to this, access to the county has been greatly reduced. Humanitarian organizations and residents enter the area from the Ugandan side of the border.

Prior to the outbreak of conflict, Yei's infrastructure was gradually being developed, but the conflict has hampered further investment. Although Yei does not have a hospital, it does have well-served clinics, some of which are funded by international aid. Yei is also home to the Yei Teacher Training College, one of only a few such institutions in South Sudan. The institution, which was founded in 2001 by the Episcopal Diocese of Yei, has drawn students from all over the country (Yei TTC, 2020). The Lantoto National Park is located in the county's west, but its precise boundaries are unknown, and illegal poaching has been a persistent problem exacerbated by insecurity.

== Conflict dynamics ==
The region has historically been an SPLA stronghold, and Yei River County was relatively unscathed after the conflict began in December 2013. However, due to its infrastructure and proximity to the border, it became a site for IDP hosting as hundreds of Nuer IDPs sought refuge in counties such as Yei River, where they were protected by the government in the former UNMISS compound. These IDPs (661 in Yei River County) were mostly families of soldiers who had defected to join the opposition. Following the outbreak of fighting in these counties in May 2015, approximately 3,000 IDPs from Mundri and Maridi sought refuge in Yei. Yei River County has also served as a refugee settlement for those fleeing neighboring countries, particularly the Democratic Republic of the Congo.

Due to the continued presence of armed rebel groups in the area and neighboring counties, the situation in Yei County changed significantly following the escalation of conflict in 2016. This resulted in significant internal displacement as well as migration across international borders, primarily to Uganda. While there is no official Protection of Civilians (PoC) site in Yei, there are ad hoc displacement sites and IDPs living among the host community in the area. According to the most recent data from early 2020, Yei is home to approximately 67,511 IDPs and 10,097 returnees (IOM DTM, 2020).

The National Salvation Front (NAS), led by Thomas Cirillo, has clashed with the South Sudan People's Defense Force in the area on numerous occasions and is not a signatory to the 2018 peace agreement. Clashes were reported as recently as May 2020 (Abraham, 2020), and as a result, the area's future security remains uncertain. In addition to the civil war, land disputes caused by migration to the area have strained relations between the host community and those who have settled in the county.

== Commonly loved foods in Yei River County ==
Yei River County is a good place with various meals ranging on different time of the year as followed below:

Ugali: A stable food made from maize flour, cassava flour, millet flour and sorghum flour, cooked to a thick-porridge like consistency.

Nyama Choma; A type of grilled meat made from goat or beef, seasoned with spices and served with a side of vegetables

Chapati: A type of flatbread made from wheat flour, often served with stew or curry.

Pilau: A fragrant rice dish cooked with spices, vegetables, and sometimes meat.

Mandazi: A sweet, deep-fried doughnuts often enjoyed as snack or dessert.

Fried fish: Fresh fish fried to perfection and served with a side of rice or Ugali.

Matoke: A dish made from cooked plantains, often served with a savory sauce or stew.

Samosas: Deep-fried pastries filled with a savory mixture of meat, vegetables and spices.

Roasted maize: Grilled or roasted corn on the cob, popular street food snack in Yei

== Climate ==
Yei has a tropical savanna climate. It is warm every month with both a wet and dry season. The average annual temperature for Yei is 55° degrees and there is about 386 inch of rain in a year. It is dry for 115 days a year with an average humidity of 68% and an UV-index of 6.

	Jan	Feb	Mar	Apr	May	Jun	Jul	Aug	Sep	Oct	Nov	Dec
Day temp. (°F)	91	92	90	85	83	82	81	81	82	82	83	87
Night temp. (°F)	67	69	69	66	64	63	63	63	63	64	64	65
	Jan	Feb	Mar	Apr	May	Jun	Jul	Aug	Sep	Oct	Nov	Dec
Precipitation (inch)	1	5	15	35	43	37	41	49	50	72	35	4
Days with rain	3	4	12	21	26	25	28	29	29	28	17	6
Dry days	28	24	19	9	5	5	3	2	1	3	13	25
	Jan	Feb	Mar	Apr	May	Jun	Jul	Aug	Sep	Oct	Nov	Dec
Sun hours per day	10	10	10	9	9	9	9	9	10	9	9	10
Wind force (Bft)	2	2	2	2	2	2	1	1	1	2	2	2
UV-index	7	7	6	6	6	6	6	6	6	6	6	7

=== Climate change ===
People in Yei face a serious threat to their health and way of life from climate change. If you live in Yei you may have already noticed the effects of climate change. You could have noticed alterations to your area's weather patterns as well as a rise in the frequency of severe storms. Some harvests will be ruined as the seasons shift and become increasingly unreliable, possibly leading to a food shortage. In addition, the rising temperatures and droughts could result in significant water shortages in Yei. The marginalized and low-income communities of Yei, who will find it more difficult to procure basic necessities, will be the ones most affected by climate change.

== Forests ==
In 2010, Nahr Yei had 1.16Mha of tree cover, extending over 89% of its land area. In 2021, it lost 416ha of tree cover, equivalent to 189kt of CO_{2} emissions.

=== List of Forests ===
1-kegulu forest, located 5kilometres from yei town lasu aba road.

2- kejiko forest

== Rivers in Yei River County ==
- Yei Kare (river)
- Yembe-7miles from Yei town, Maridi Road.
- Kogbo- 11miles from Yei town, Maridi Road
- Lebele-5miles from Yei town, Maridi Road
- Lakuja-3miles from Yei town, Maridi Road
- Lutaya -3miles from Yei town, Aba (DRC) Road
- Logboronga-6miles from Yei town, Aba (DRC) Road
- Kegulu-7miles from Yei town, Aba (DRC) Road
- Yembe- Aba (DRC) Road
- Ayisa- Aba (DRC) Road
- Kembe- Juba Road
- River gali 20 miles from yei town maridi
- Bandame 32 miles from yei town maridi road
- Auo 45 miles from yei town maridi road
- Tore river 48 miles from yei town maridi road
- River Kawe, originate from Mugo mountain and drain into River Yei ( Yei Kare)

== Mountains ==
- Tokori, Maridi Road
- Lopi'do'do, Maridi Road
- Jakaya, Maridi Road
- Otogo in Otogo Payam
- Longamere, Kaya Road
- Koro'be
- Mugwo, Kaya Road
- Kulujame in Lasu Payam
- Ambujo in Lasu Payam
- 'Biya in Lasu Payam
- Yago in Lasu payam
- Nyangiriba in Lasu payam
- Nguti in Lasu payam

1.Tidu Mountain

2.Payawa Mountain

3.Otogo Mountain

4.Korobe Mountain

== Tribes ==
- Kakwa One of the tribes in Yei
- Pojulu Mukaya, 2 miles from Yei Town, Kiripkala, about 4 miles from Aba road
- Keliko in (Mitika) Lasu payam
- Mundu- 20 miles Maridi Road
- Makaraka 13miles Maridi Road
- Avokaya
- Baka 50miles Maridi road
1. River yei
2. River Kembe is a stream and is located in Central Equatoria State, South Sudan. The estimate terrain elevation above sea level is 776 metres. Variant forms of spelling for River Kembe or in other languages: River Kembe, Kembe, Kembe, River Kembe.
3. gobili river
4. River yembe is the second largest river in yei county and its located 10 kilometers from yei town lasu road.

River Kogbo located 16 miles ABA road

== Roads ==
There are four primary roads from Yei.

- (Yei-maridi road) Northwest to Rasolo payam of Maridi County – conditions were unknown during the rainy season in 2019, and the route was labeled with “road warning” during the dry season.
- (Yei-lainya road) Northeast to Lainya County and Juba – accessible for vehicles during the dry season in 2019, however “road warnings” were issued during the rainy season. This road had experienced significant insecurity following the outbreak of conflict in 2016, due to the presence of different armed factions in the area. Since the signing of the peace agreement in 2018, such incidents have reduced although public transport along the road still relies on security measures such as escorts and traveling in convoys
- (Yei-kaya road)South to Morobo County – conditions unknown for the rainy season in 2019, however he road through limited accessibility with “road warnings” during the dry season.
- East to Kajo-Keji County – conditions unknown for the rainy season in 2019, however parts of the road through Lainya County had limited accessibility with “road warnings” during the dry season.
- The primary road heading to the border with Uganda was labeled with “road warning” during the dry season in 2019, and the condition was unknown during the rainy season.
- (Yei-Aba/lasu road)A secondary road runs southwest from Yei to the border with DRC, however seasonal conditions are unknown.
- Yei Morobu Road via Udabi/ Ombaci O Kakwa
