= Morobo County =

Coordinates: 3.6693°N 30.8766°E

- County
- Country: South Sudan
- State: Central Equatoria

Government
  - Commissioner: Joseph Mawa Ukuba

Area
  - Total: 1,304 km^{2} (503 sq mi)

Population (2017)
  - Total: 148,023
  - Density: 113.5/km^{2} (294.0/sq mi)
- Time zone: UTC+2 (CAT)

Morobo is one of the six counties in Central Equatoria state, South Sudan. Morobo County borders Uganda and Congo. The county is mainly occupied by Kakwa speaking people, Keliko and Lugbara. The people in Morobo are local farmers working for food. Morobo is part of the green belt and also acts as a breadbasket for Yei and Juba.

There has been sporadic violence in Morobo County since the establishment of South Sudan at the end of the Second Sudanese Civil War. The UN is working with locals to address these issues.

Joseph Mawa is the current commissioner of Morobo County.

== Demography ==
The Demographics of Morobo County
2008 Census population	103,603
2020 Population projection	104,106
Major ethnic groups	Kakwa, Keliko, Lugbara
Languages	Kakwa, Kaliko, Lugbara
Displacement Figures: IDPs	2,495
Bordering Counties	Lainya, Yei, Kajo-Keji
Nearby Countries	Uganda and Democratic Republic of Congo
Displacement Figures: returnees	7,564

== list of payams in morobo county ==
- Kimba payam
- Panyume payam
- Lujule payam
- Wudab payam

== Economy and livelihood ==
Morobo County is located in the state of Central Equatoria. It is bounded to the north-west by Yei County, to the north-east by Lainya County, to the south-east by Uganda, and to the south-west by the Democratic Republic of the Congo.

The county is located in South Sudan's greenbelt and has fertile soil, making it an ideal location for agricultural activities. Morobo County, according to FEWSNET (2018), is in the equatorial maize and cassava livelihoods zone. Groundnuts, sorghum, milt, banana, cassava, and maize are among the most common and marketable crops grown in the region, but farmers frequently struggle to obtain quality seeds due to trade and transportation issues.

A REACH assessment in 2018 revealed that while 88% of the population had access to a functional market, 100% of the population was estimated to be receiving food aid, and 88% relied on subsistence agriculture to support their households. Furthermore, families in the area reported eating one meal per day on average. Due to "unsafe access to land," half of the population was reported to be food insecure. Aside from agricultural occupations, half of the population reported owning cattle. The county is also well known for mineral extraction in South Sudan. According to a Cordaid report published in 2016, there were approximately 5,000 artisanal gold miners operating in the area, but it is unclear how much of this number has been impacted by the conflict.

== Climate ==
Morobo has a tropical savanna climate (Köppen: Aw). It is warm every month with both a wet and dry season. The average annual temperature for Morobo is 29° degrees and there is about 981 mm of rain in a year. It is dry for 115 days a year with an average humidity of 68% and an UV-index of 6.

=== Climate Morobo by month ===
	Jan	Feb	Mar	Apr	May	Jun	Jul	Aug	Sep	Oct	Nov	Dec
Day temp. (°C)	33	34	32	30	28	28	27	27	28	28	28	30
Night temp. (°C)	19	21	21	19	18	17	17	17	17	18	18	19
	Jan	Feb	Mar	Apr	May	Jun	Jul	Aug	Sep	Oct	Nov	Dec
Precipitation (mm)	3	13	37	90	110	93	104	125	126	182	88	11
Days with rain	3	4	12	21	26	25	28	29	29	28	17	6
Dry days	28	24	19	9	5	5	3	2	1	3	13	25
	Jan	Feb	Mar	Apr	May	Jun	Jul	Aug	Sep	Oct	Nov	Dec
Sun hours per day	10	10	10	9	9	9	9	9	10	9	9	10
Wind force (Bft)	2	2	2	2	2	2	1	1	1	2	2	2
UV-index	7	7	6	6	6	6	6	6	6	6	6	7

== Infrastructure and services ==
Morobo County is located on the border with Uganda, making it a vital area for both human migration and trade. Kaya is one of the county's unofficial migration points. However, insufficient infrastructure, particularly roads and affordable transportation options, limits Morobo residents' ability to expand their agricultural activities to commercial levels. Residents' ability to access their land for subsistence agricultural livelihoods has also been hampered by the area's insecurity. Insecurity in the area, particularly in 2017, has resulted in the deterioration of schools, clinics, and homes, as well as the destruction of crops.

According to OCHA's (2019) Humanitarian Needs Overview for 2020, Morobo County has an estimated 81,200 people in need, which is approximately 78% of the estimated population reported in the HNO. According to the same report, Morobo County has the highest level of recorded landmine and explosive remnants of war, which have proliferated as a result of the recent conflict in the Equatoria region. This is especially problematic given the high number of IDP border crossings in the area. Landmines have also made it difficult for residents to access basic services in the area, such as healthcare and schools.

== Conflict dynamics ==
Prior to 2016, Morobo County had avoided the worst of the national conflict and was regarded as one of the most stable areas in the country. Armed militia robberies, on the other hand, were common and sometimes deadly. Because of its proximity to Uganda and the Democratic Republic of the Congo, the county is home to a large number of South Sudanese returnees from those countries. Due to border demarcation disputes, there was some tension between communities on both sides of the border with the DRC. According to local media reports, a conflict between residents near the border sparked by the alleged raising of DRC flags in Morobo villages was referred to the national government in May 2016. (Gilbert, 2016). When conflict erupted for the second time in 2016, Morobo County was one of the areas in Central Equatoria where opposition forces fled and remained.

In 2019, according to VOA, civilians were targeted by armed forces in addition to being caught in the crossfire between government and opposition forces. Attacks on humanitarian workers have also occurred in Morobo. Two aid workers were killed in April 2016 near Gulumbi Village. Armed groups kidnapped and killed three IOM staff monitoring the border for Ebola in Kaya, Morobo County, in October 2019. (IOM, 2019). This resulted in the indefinite suspension of border monitoring. Despite the signing of the R-ARCISS in 2018, the National Salvation Front (NAS), a non-signatory to the agreement, continues to operate in the area, causing insecurity in the county.

== Education ==
Schools in Morobo County have faced challenges from conflict and the displacement of people from other areas.

== Commissioners of Morobo County ==
S/N	Names in full	Year
1	Hon. Remo X	2001- 2003
2	Hon. Ofeni Ngota	2004 - 2008
3	Hon. Mary Apayi	2009-2010
4	Hon. Moses Soro	2011-2015
5	Hon. Mawa Joseph	2016 - 2024
6	Hon. Data John	2025 - 2026
7	Hon. Joseph Mawa John Okuba	2026 update
