= Central Equatoria =

State of South Sudan

- State
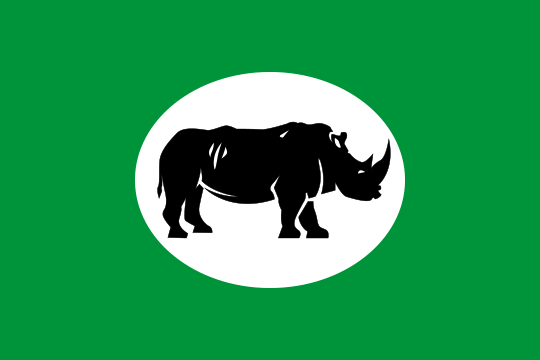
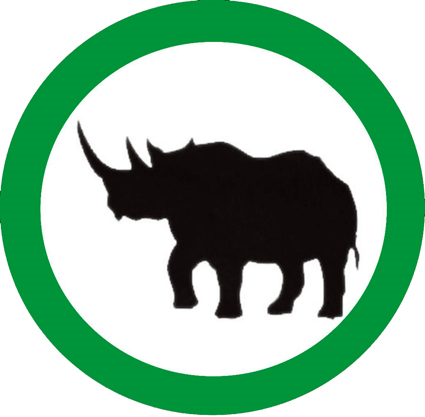
- Flag Seal

- Central Equatoria in South Sudan
- Coordinates: 04°47′N 31°24′E
- Country: South Sudan
- Region: Equatoria
- Number of counties: 6
- Capital: Juba

Government
  - Governor: Emmanuel Adil Anthony

Area
  - Total: 43,033.00 km^{2} (16,615.13 sq mi)

Population (2014 Estimate)
  - Total: 1,103,592
- Time zone: UTC+2 (CAT)
- HDI (2021): 0.463 low · 1st of 10
- Website: ceg.gov.ss

Central Equatoria is a state in South Sudan. With an area of 43,033 square kilometres (16,615 sq mi), it is the smallest of the original South Sudanese states. Its previous name was Bahr al-Jabal (also Bahr-el-Jebel), named after a tributary of the White Nile that flows through the state. It was renamed Central Equatoria in the first Interim Legislative Assembly on 1 April 2005 under the government of Southern Sudan. Central Equatoria seceded from Sudan as part of the Republic of South Sudan on 9 July 2011. The state's capital, Juba, is also the national capital of South Sudan. On October 2, 2015, the state was split into three states: Jubek, Terekeka, and Yei River. The state of Central Equatoria was re-established by a peace agreement signed on 22 February 2020.

== Administrative divisions ==
Central Equatoria, like other states in South Sudan, is subdivided into counties, which are further divided into Payams, then Bomas. Each county is led by a County Commissioner, appointed by the State Governor in consultation with the President. They are:

- Juba County
- Lainya County
- Morobo County
- Terekeka County
- Yei River County
- Kajo Keji County
- major cities and towns of central equatoria

Juba, Kajo Keji, Liria, Mongalla, Wonduruba, Rokon,Tijor,Tali, Terekeka, Yei, Ji-Menze, Tombek, Tindilo, Kaya, Muni, Morobo, and Rijong. The major border crossing to the neighboring Democratic Republic of the Congo is at Dimo, a village in the state.

== Demographics ==
Major tribes of Central Equatoria have included the Bari, Mandari, Pojulu, Kakwa, Keliko, Kuku, Lugbara, Avukaya, Baka, Nyangwara, Adio, and Lulubo. Minor tribes have included the Nyepo in Northern Kajo Keji County and the Lokoya along the Nimule Road. Erasto Gonda, Senior Folklore Officer for Central Equatoria's information ministry, further detailed the State's demographics:

In terms of tribes in Central Equatoria, we have Mundari of Terekeka County, the Pojulu of Lainya, Wonduruba and Tijor counties combined, and the Bari of Juba County, who are the largest. Then we have the Kuku from Kajok Keji County, Nyangwara from Rokon area – then we have the Kakwa, from Yei County and Morobo, then there is the Keliko from Morobo County, the Avokaya, Mundo and Baka from Tore Payam of Yei County. Additionally, there are the Pojulu-Tijor in Tijor.

So, these tribes are the eight tribes who speak one language with slight differences, Kutuk, although they all have different traditional dances. Mundari language for example has its own notion tone different from Bari but they also speak Bari at the same time because some of the border the Bari to the north of Juba, although there are differences in some of the words. Some of the tribes like Avokaya of Yei County, Lugbara and Keliko of Morobo speak one language with slight differences except Mundo and Baka which speak different languages. But they all also have their special languages, called their ‘Kobura’ which the others do not understand. It is a hidden language, they speak it during danger.

They are all from one family but got separated because of land, the land was not enough. They were at first were pastoralists, and then diverged as pastoralists and agriculturalists.

Then there is also the Direr or Nubi, these people are a collection of tribes and their religion is Islam. They settled together in two main places, Malakia in Juba and Bombo which is near Kampala in Uganda. They are united by their religion, which came to them in the 1940s. They now consider themselves to be a new tribe.

The agriculturalists out of these are the Bari, Kuku, the Kakwa, Avokaya, Mundo, Pojulu, Lokoya, Lulubo, Nyangwara, Keliko, Nyepo. They grow a variety of crops, including maize, cassava, sweet potatoes, 'bolot or sorghum, millet, groundnuts, beans.cow peas, yams These tribes have two crops to harvest every year, the first in June or July and the second in November or December. They also keep small number of cattle, goats, and sheep and keep poultry, duck and pigeons.

== Culture and languages ==
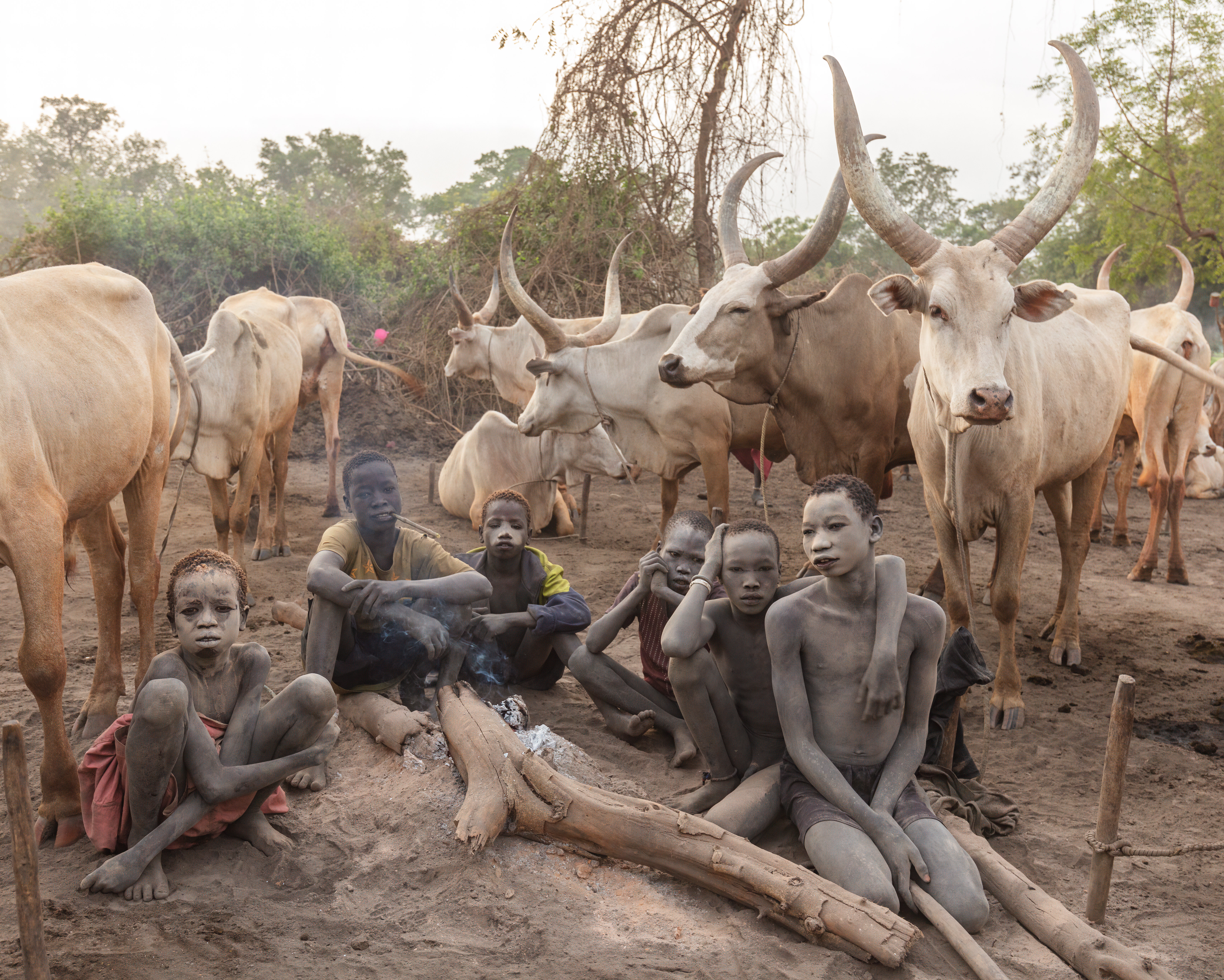
Cattle camp of the Mundari people in South Sudan

Due to the South Sudanese Civil War, the state's culture was heavily influenced by the countries neighboring South Sudan. Many South Sudanese fled to Ethiopia, Kenya and Uganda, where they interacted with the nationals and learned their languages and culture. Most of those who remained in the country or went north to Sudan and Egypt assimilated into Arab culture.

It is also worth noting that most South Sudanese diaspore kept the core of their culture even while in exile. Traditional culture is highly held and great attention is given to knowing one's origin and dialect. Although the common languages spoken are Juba Arabic and English, Swahili began to be introduced to the population to improve the country's relations with its East African neighbors. Many people from Central Equatoria use English, Kiswahili, Juba Arabic, their dialect, or a mixture of the languages mentioned.

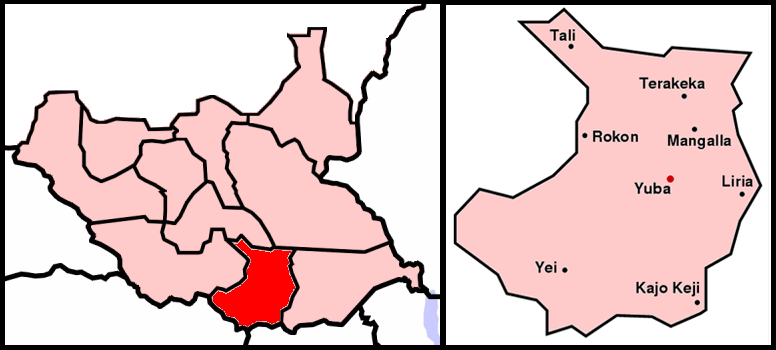

== Government ==
Directly before Central Equatoria split up into three separate states in 2015, the government was as shown:

- Governor – Juma Ali Malou
- Deputy Governor – Sarah Nene Redento
- Governor_ Emmanuel Adil Anthony

== Advisors ==
1. Angelo Daya Loku, peace and security (SSOA)
2. David Wani, Economic affairs (IO)
3. Jacob Gore Samuel, Legal Affairs (IG)
4. JeniferYobu, Human Rights (IG)
5. Mariam A. Zachariah, Fever and social welfare (IG)

== Ministers ==
1. Hon. Wayi Godwin Edward, Minister of Cabinet Affairs (IO)
2. Hon. Moro Isaac Geneios, Minister of Local Government and Law Enforcement (SSOA)
3. Hon. Gerald Francis Nyukuye, Minister of Peace Building (IG)
4. Hon. Taban Emmanuel Baya, Minister of parliamentary and Legal Affairs (IO)
5. Hon. Andruga Mabe Severio, Minister of Information and Communication (OPP)
6. Hon. Rita Dominic Lado, Minister of Culture, Youth and Sports (IG)
7. Hon. Diana Susu Hassan, Minister of Finance, Planning, and Investment ( IG)
8. Hon. Wani Tom Sebit, Minister of Trade and Industry (IG)
9. Hon. Lily Kufuki Paul, Ministry of Agriculture, Environment, and Forestry (SSOA)
10. Hon. Alex Latio Elia, Minister of Animal Resources, Fisheries and Tourism (IG)
11. Hon Peter Lujo Yospeta, Minister of Cooperative and Rural Development (IO)
12. Hon. Flora Gabriel Modi, Minister of Housing, Land and Public Utilities (IG)
13. Hon. Mawa A. Moses, Minister of Roads and Bridges (IG)
14. Hon. Modi John Molla, Minister of Labor, public services and Human Resource (IG)
15. Hon. Nejua Marsha, Minister of Heath (IG)
16. Hon. Cirisio Zachariah, Minister of General Education and Instruction (IO)
17. Hon. Bullen Soro Amos, Minister of Gender, Child and Social Welfare (IG)

== Independent Commissions ==
1. George Wani Elia, Anti- corruption (IO) deputized by Kenyi Abiaso
2. Asio Moses John, employees justice chamber (IO) deputized by Huda Michael Laila
3. Marino Michael Sebit, HIV/AIDS (SSOA)
4. Felix Lado Johnson, PRC (IG) deputized by Amal Suleiman
5. Isaac Wuri Eluni, Human Rights (IG) deputized by Emmanuel kose Wani (IO)
6. Henry Kala Sabuni, Conflict Resolution and Reconciliation (IG) deputized by Amule Barnabas Lemi

== County commissioners ==
1. Hon. Charles Joseph Wani, Juba County (SSOS)
2. Hon. Aggrey Cyrus, Yei River County (IG)
3. Hon. Joseph Mawa, Morobo County(IG)
4. Hon. James Lino Malou Anok, Terekeka County (IO)
5. Hon. Emmauel Khamis Richard, Lainya County (IG)
6. Hon. Kenyi Erasto Michael, Kajo Keji County (IO)

== Climate ==
Central Equatoria lies close to the Equator and has a tropical savanna climate (Köppen climate classification Aw), characterised by a long wet season and a shorter, hotter dry season driven by the seasonal movement of the Intertropical Convergence Zone.

=== Temperature ===
Temperatures remain high and relatively stable year-round. Average annual maximum temperatures reach around 34 °C (93 °F), with daytime highs ranging from about 31 °C (88 °F) in August to 39 °C (102 °F) in February, and nighttime lows ranging from roughly 22 °C (72 °F) in August to 26 °C (79 °F) in February. On a mean basis, the average yearly temperature is about 27.2 °C (81.0 °F), with March typically the warmest month, averaging around 30 °C (86 °F).

=== Rainfall and seasons ===
Rainfall is strongly seasonal. Annual precipitation averages around 1,145 millimetres (45.1 in), with a distinct dry season from December to March; October is typically the wettest month, receiving about 188 millimetres (7.4 in), while January is the driest, with only around 4.7 millimetres (0.19 in). Other long-term records give a somewhat lower annual figure of approximately 1,048 millimetres (41.3 in), reflecting differences between averaging periods and monitoring stations. More broadly across the south-central belt of South Sudan that includes Central Equatoria, average annual rainfall generally falls between 1,200 and 1,600 millimetres (47 and 63 in), with some elevated southern areas receiving considerably more.

The rainy season builds gradually from April, intensifies through the middle of the year, and peaks around September–October before dry northeasterly winds return. From December to March the region lies under dry northeasterly winds bringing minimal rainfall; by early April moist south-westerlies arrive, bringing heavy rain and thunderstorms that weaken as the season progresses, until the dry northeasterlies begin strengthening again around October.

=== Humidity and sunshine ===
Humidity follows the rainfall cycle closely, ranging from roughly 42% in the driest months to about 81% during the height of the wet season. Sunshine hours are highest during the dry season and lowest during the cloudier rains, with January the sunniest month (around 279 hours) and July the cloudiest (around 183 hours).

=== Regional variation and climate risk ===
Within South Sudan, Central Equatoria has been described as one of the country's comparatively cooler, drier states, in contrast with the warmer, rainier Upper Nile region. Seasonal climate monitoring has periodically identified pockets of below-average rainfall within the state, with parts of central Central Equatoria recording totals 25–100 mm below the seasonal average in some years. At the same time, forecasters have pointed to a broader pattern of above-average rains and rising flood risk across South Sudan in recent years, driven partly by elevated water levels in upstream lakes and rivers feeding the White Nile system.

Climate data for Juba (representative of Central Equatoria climate)
Month	Jan	Feb	Mar	Apr	May	Jun	Jul	Aug	Sep	Oct	Nov	Dec	Year
Mean daily maximum °F (°C)	99 (37)	102 (39)	100 (38)	97 (36)	93 (34)	90 (32)	88 (31)	88 (31)	90 (32)	90 (32)	93 (34)	97 (36)	94 (34)
Mean daily minimum °F (°C)	68 (20)	79 (26)	72 (22)	72 (22)	70 (21)	68 (20)	68 (20)	72 (22)	68 (20)	68 (20)	68 (20)	68 (20)	70 (21)
Average precipitation inches (mm)	0.19 (4.7)	0.3 (8)	1.6 (40)	3.5 (88)	5.4 (136)	4.7 (120)	5.7 (145)	5.2 (131)	4.1 (104)	7.4 (188)	1.7 (43)	0.3 (8)	40.09 (1,015.7)
Source: Weather and Climate / Weather Atlas / Climate-Data.org (1990–2021 averages)

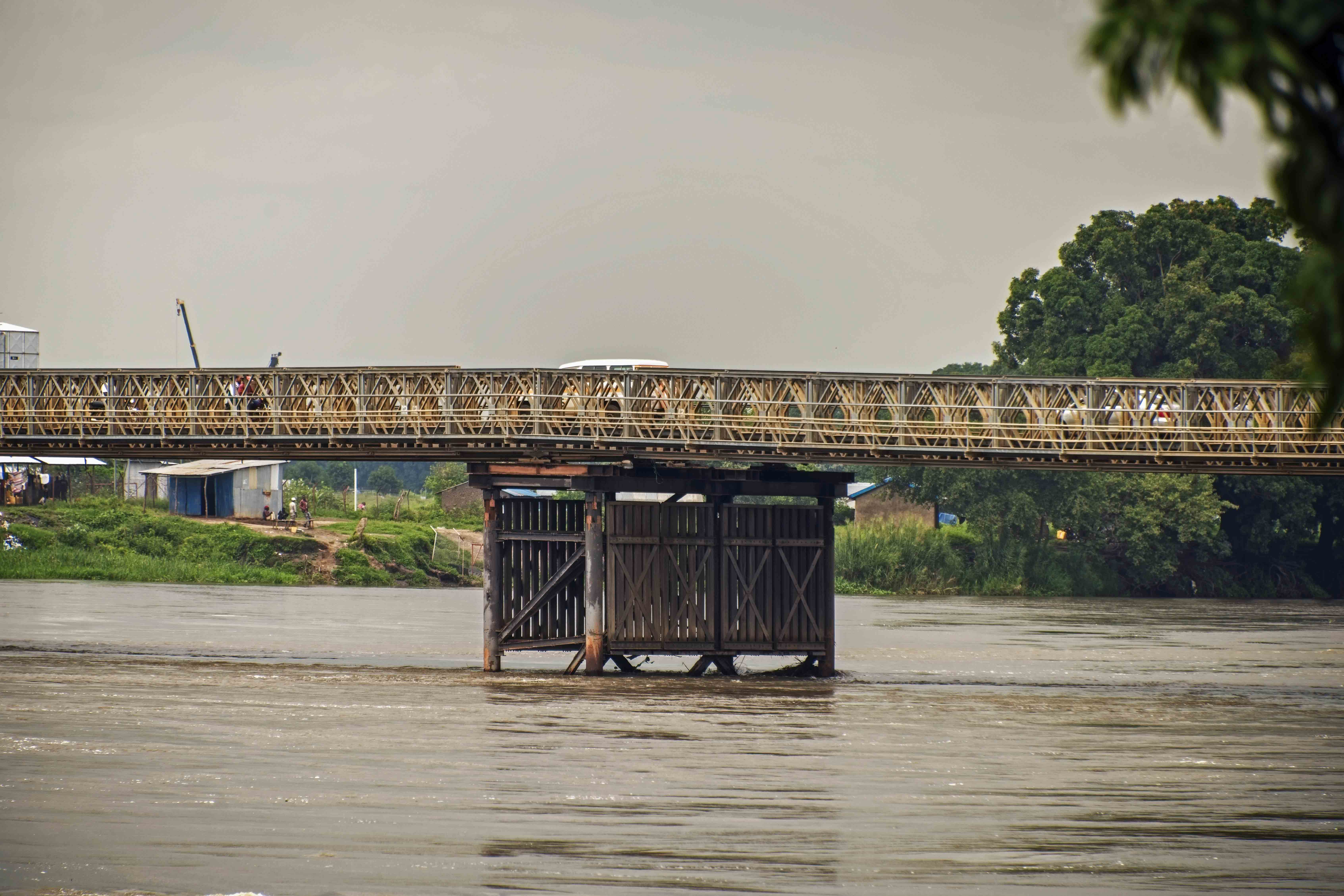
The White Nile at Juba; the river and its floodplain strongly influence local humidity and seasonal flood risk in Central Equatoria.

== See also ==
- Mundari people
- Bari people (South Sudan)
- Pojulu Tribe
- Keliko People
- Equatoria
  - Western Equatoria
  - Eastern Equatoria
