= List of bridges in Sudan =

== Major bridges in Sudan ==
This table presents a non-exhaustive list of the road and railway bridges in Sudan with spans greater than 100 metres (328 ft) or total lengths longer than 500 metres (1,640 ft).

	Name	Arabic	Span	Length	Type	Carries Crosses	Opened	Location	Governorate	Ref.
1	Tuti North Bridge project		300 m (980 ft)	600 m (2,000 ft)	Cable-stayed; Concrete deck and pylons 150+300+150	Road bridge Blue Nile		Khartoum North–Tuti Island; 15°37′05.1″N 32°30′52.7″E	Khartoum	(Note: Another design includes a single tower cable-stayed bridge with a 202 metres (663 ft) main span.)
2	Tuti Bridge	كبري توتي	210 m (690 ft)	310 m (1,020 ft)	Suspension; Composite steel/concrete deck, concrete pylons 50+210+50	Road bridge Blue Nile	2009	Khartoum–Tuti Island; 15°36′30″N 32°30′45.8″E	Khartoum	
3	El Mek Nimr Bridge	جسر المك نمر	80 m (260 ft)	1,165 m (3,822 ft)	Cable-stayed; Composite steel/concrete deck, steel pylons 55+80+55	Road bridge Blue Nile	2007	Khartoum–Khartoum North; 15°36′49.3″N 32°31′58.1″E	Khartoum	(Note: Also called Al MakNimir Bridge.)
4	Salvation Bridge	كبري الفتيحاب	80 m (260 ft)	757 m (2,484 ft)	Box girder Prestressed concrete 46+80+46	Road bridge White Nile	1999	Khartoum–Omdurman; 15°36′10.3″N 32°29′32.1″E	Khartoum	(Note: Also called Al-Fatehab Bridge or Victory Bridge.)
5	Omdurman Bridge	جسر أم درمان	74 m (243 ft)(x7)	613 m (2,011 ft)	Truss; Steel; Swing bridge	Road bridge White Nile	1928	Khartoum–Omdurman; 15°36′46.7″N 32°29′33.4″E	Khartoum	
6	Blue Nile Road and Railway Bridge	كبري النيل الأزرق	66 m (217 ft)(x7)	560 m (1,840 ft)	Truss; Steel	Railway bridge Road bridge Blue Nile	1909	Khartoum–Khartoum North; 15°36′57.7″N 32°32′38.0″E	Khartoum	
7	Al-Dabasin Bridge	كبري الدباسين		1,670 m (5,480 ft)	Beam bridge Composite steel/concrete	Road bridge White Nile		Khartoum–Omdurman; 15°30′45.6″N 32°28′18.8″E	Khartoum	
8	Shambat Bridge	جسر شمبات		1,057 m (3,468 ft)	Box girder Prestressed concrete	Road bridge Nile	1960	Khartoum North–Omdurman; 15°38′38.3″N 32°30′24.3″E	Khartoum	
9	Al-Halfaya Bridge	جسر الحلفايا		910 m (2,990 ft)	Beam bridge Composite steel/concrete	Road bridge Nile	2010 (partially destroyed in 2024)	Khartoum North–Omdurman; 15°42′49.8″N 32°31′55.7″E	Khartoum	
10	Kober Bridge	كوبرى كوبر		767 m (2,516 ft)	Box girder Prestressed concrete Twin bridges	Road bridge Blue Nile	1972	Khartoum–Khartoum North; 15°37′00.2″N 32°33′17.6″E	Khartoum	(Note: Also called Burri Bridge or Armed Forces Bridge.)
11	Omdurman-Tuti Bridge project			600 m (2,000 ft)	Beam bridge Composite steel/concrete	Road bridge White Nile		Omdurman–Tuti Island; 15°37′25.3″N 32°29′29.6″E	Khartoum	

== Major bridges in South Sudan ==
This table presents a non-exhaustive list of the major road and railway bridges in South Sudan.

	Name	Span	Length	Type	Carries Crosses	Opened	Location	Governorate	Ref.
1	Freedom Bridge (South Sudan)	87 m (285 ft)(x4)	560 m (1,840 ft)	Arch; Steel tied arch Bow-string bridge	Road bridge Juba Bypass; White Nile	2022	Juba; 4°48′38.7″N 31°36′13.2″E	Central Equatoria	
2	Juba Nile Bridge	43 m (141 ft)	258 m (846 ft)	Truss; Steel; Bailey bridge	A43 highway White Nile	1974	Juba; 4°49′22.2″N 31°36′31.5″E	Central Equatoria	

== See also ==
- Transport in Sudan
- Rail transport in Sudan
- Geography of Egypt
- List of rivers of Egypt
