= Shambat =

Shambat may refer to:

- Shambat (city), city in Sudan
- Shambat Bridge, bridge in Sudan
- Shambat (khan), 7th century khan of the Bulgars
