= Roads in South Sudan =

Highway system in South Sudan

The following is a list of national roads in South Sudan. The list is not exhaustive.

== National roads ==
List of national roads In South Sudan
Number	Name of road	Distance	Designated	Completed
1	Juba–Nimule Road	192 kilometres (119 mi)	2007	2012
2	Gulu–Nimule Road	105 kilometres (65 mi)	2012	2015
3	Aggrey Jaden Road (Juba-Yei- Kaya Road)	243 kilometres (151 mi)	2022	2025 (expected)
4	Juba-Torit-Nadapal Highway	353 kilometres (219 mi)	?	?
5	Juba-Bor-Malakal Highway	500 kilometres (311 mi)	2020	2025 (expected)
6	Juba–Terekeka–Rumbek Road	392 kilometres (244 mi)	2019	2025 (expected)
7	Kajo Keji-Juba Road	156 kilometres (97 mi)	?	?
8	Paloich–Maiwut–Pagak Road	220 kilometres (137 mi)	2024	2029 (expected)

== See also ==
- Transport in South Sudan
