= Juba–Terekeka–Rumbek Road =

Road in South Sudan

Coordinates: 05°39′34″N 31°03′49″E

Route information
- Length: 244 mi (393 km)

Major junctions
- South end: Juba
- Terekeka; Tindalo; Yirol
- North end: Rumbek

Location
- Country: South Sudan

Highway system
- Transport in South Sudan

The Juba–Terekeka–Rumbek Road also Juba–Rumbek Road, is a road in South Sudan, connecting the cities of Juba and Rumbek, through Terekeka, Tindalo and Yirol. As of September 2022, the road is under improvement and rehabilitation to class II bitumen standard, with bridges, culverts, shoulders and drainage channels. The work has been going on since 2019.

== Location ==
The road starts at Juba, the capital and largest city in South Sudan. It travels in a general northerly direction to the town of Terekeka, also located on the western bank of the White Nile, a distance of approximately 75 kilometres (47 mi). From there, the road travels in a general northwesterly direction, though the towns of Tindalo and Yirol, to end at Rumbek, a distance of 354 kilometres (220 mi). Reliable online sources quote to total contract length of this road as 392 kilometres (244 mi).

== Upgrade to bituminous surface ==
In 2014 the government of South Sudan contracted with Shandong Hi-Speed Group Company, Limited (SDHS), to upgrade this road to class II bitumen standard, at an estimated price of US$711 million. The project was temporarily halted in 2016 when fighting erupted in South Sudan.

In 2018 the Exim Bank of China signed an agreement with the government of South Sudan to lend US$1.3 billion, with some of the proceeds directed towards the building of this road. The loan would be repaid with proceeds from the sale of 30,000 barrels of oil daily. The money realized from the sale of the crude oil would be deposited in an account over which Exim Bank of China had control. Exim Bank would then pay the engineering, procurement and construction (EPC) contractor from that account. The shipment of the crude oil started in May 2019 and the building of the road commenced in October 2019.

As of September 2022, the road section between Juba and Terekeka, measuring 63 kilometres (39 mi), was complete and available for use by the public. That month, the South Sudan's cabinet approved a further $25 million to cater for items previously overlooked, including bridges and compensation to landowners. This brought the new budget of this road to US$736,533,725.

== Other considerations ==
It is planned by the South Sudanese authorities, to build a spur off this road to lead to a future city at Ramciel, where the new national capital is expected to be built.

== See also ==
- Roads in South Sudan
