= Netherlands–South Sudan relations =

- Netherlands: South Sudan

Netherlands–South Sudan relations are the bilateral relations between the Netherlands and South Sudan. Diplomatic ties were established on July 9, 2011, the day South Sudan gained independence. The Netherlands and South Sudan mostly focus on humanitarian aid. The Netherlands is the biggest donor to the South Sudan Humanitarian Fund.

== History ==
Before South Sudanese independence, the Netherlands has called for peace efforts, and supported South Sudanese independence.

In 2019, Dutch Vice-Minister, Reina Buijs, called for South Sudan to push to end violence, and create a peace agreement.

From March 13-15, 2024, Pascalle Grotenhuis, met in Juba for talks between the two nations. She stated "The Netherlands is working to help provide vocational education, to enhance the position of these young people on the labour market." The Netherlands finances SEED4youth, with hopes to bring in 20,000 young people with skill. The Netherlands also helps finance support for the Youth Employment and Empowerment Project.

The next day, on March 14, 2024, Grotenhuis visited the Protection of Civilians camp in Malakal. The Netherlands goal is to help improve the situation of these people, by the means of conflict mediation. In Malakal, the Netherlands funded a project to increase mutual trust between different groups of three tribes.

During the Sudanese civil war, the Netherlands supported the initiative for a transit camp. Grotenhuis stated "As the biggest donor to the South Sudan Humanitarian Fund we help humanitarian partners in the reception of these refugees and transport to their next destination."

On March 15, 2024, both countries celebrated the 50th anniversary of the Juba Nile Bridge.

== Aid in South Sudan ==
The Netherlands has supported projects to help youth, employment, and peace in South Sudan.

The Netherlands Triple-Nexus approach in South Sudan hopes to interconnect humanitarian, peacebuilding and development work efforts as one.

The Netherlands Dutch Relief Alliance, and its partners, has worked with South Sudan since 2015, in 2019, they were able to provide 106,500 with food security and livelihoods, and multi-purpose cash and protection support.

The Netherlands have funded multi-year efforts through United Nations agencies, to clear war debris. UNMAS has worked closely with the Netherlands, to clear war debris, which includes explosives, from South Sudan.

== Trade ==
In 2024, the Netherlands exported $7.59M worth of goods to South Sudan. Their top export was engine ports, which totaled $909k. In the same year, South Sudan exported $8.06k worth of goods to the Netherlands. Their top export was revolution counters, which totaled $5.97k.

== High-level visits ==
=== High level visits from the Netherlands to South Sudan ===
- Pascalle Grotenhuis (March 13-15, 2024)

== Diplomatic missions ==
- The Netherlands has an embassy in Juba.
- South Sudan is accredited to the Netherlands through its embassy in Brussels.

== See also ==
- Foreign relations of the Netherlands
- Foreign relations of South Sudan
