= Michael Lado Allah-Jabu =

South Sudanese politician

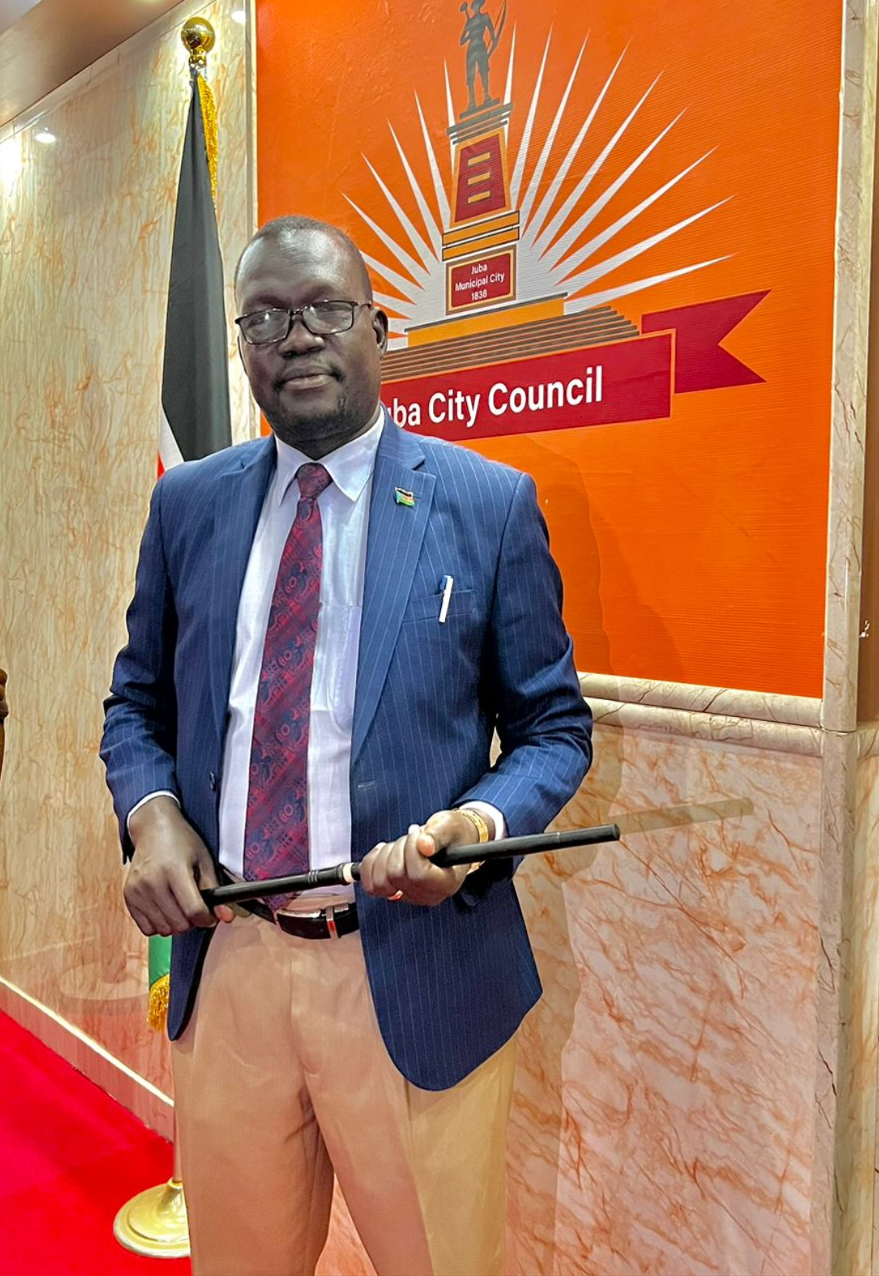
A portrait of Michael Lado Allah-Jabu. Photo: Woja Emmanuel

Michael Lado Thomas Allah-Jabu (born 1 January 1972) is a South Sudanese politician. He is the former mayor of Juba City Council in Central Equatoria as of 2023. Allah-Jabu was appointed by Governor of Central Equatoria, Emmanuel Adil Anthony in November 19, 2021, replacing Kalisto Lado who was removed in a gubernatorial decree.

On June 27, 2023, Allah-Jabu was removed from office by the Government of Central Equatoria state serving over a year and 6 months.

== Early life and education ==
Allah-Jabu was born in Luwala Boma of Lobonok Payam in Juba County, Central Equatoria to Thomas Kulang Allah-Jabu and 'Diko Ajuda from Limi Clan.

He started his education at Lobonok Elementary Primary school from 1979 to 1982. He later joined Motoyo Primary School in Nimule,Eastern Equatoria when his uncle Awad Abbas Mursal migrated there in 1982, where he completed his primary leaving education.

He later joined Rei Intermediate School in Nimule Town in 1985.

== Career ==
He first became the Chairperson (Sheikh Al-Hella) of Buluk Quarter Council in 2009 where he served for nine years in which he contributed in the Sudan National Elections in 2010 and the 2011 referendum that led to the independence of South Sudan.

In 2011, Michael Allah-Jabu was first elected as the Speaker of Juba City Legislative Council where he served for two terms up to 2018.

In 2018, he was appointed in a gubernatorial decree by Governor of Jubek, Augustino Jadalla Wani as Deputy Commissioner General for Insurance and Regulatory Authority of Jubek.

Press Secretary in the presidency Office of the Vice President for Economic Cluster Dr. James Wani Igga for about a year.

On November 19, 2021, he then became the New Mayor of Juba City Council through an order.
