= Paloich–Maiwut–Pagak Road =

Road in South Sudan and Ethiopia

Coordinates: 08°31′N 34°01′E

Route information
- Length: 137 mi (220 km)
- History: Designated in 2024; Completion in 2029

Major junctions
- North end: Paloich, South Sudan
- Mathiang, South Sudan; Maiwut, South Sudan
- South end: Pagak, Ethiopia

Location
- Country: South Sudan

Highway system
- Transport in South Sudan

Paloich–Maiwut–Pagak Road is a road in northeastern South Sudan, connecting the town of Paloich in Upper Nile State and the town of Pagak, in the Gambela Region of Ethiopia, immediately south of the international border between the two countries.

== Location ==
The Paloich–Maiwut–Pagak Road starts at Paloich and continues in a general southerly direction, through Mathiang and Maiwut, before ending in Pagak, Ethiopia at the border between South Sudan and Ethiopia, a distance of approximately 220 kilometres (137 mi).

== Overview ==
In May 2023, the government of Ethiopia and the government of South Sudan, signed an agreement for the two neighboring countries to build a road to connect the two countries at a contract price of US$738 million. Ethiopia will finance the project and South Sudan will repay the loan by delivering crude oil to Ethiopia.

== Ratification of agreement ==
On Tuesday, 25 June 2024, the Transitional National Legislative Assembly of South Sudan "ratified the Ethiopia-South Sudan financial agreement to build a cross-border highway". Once the authorization of the head of state of South Sudan is obtained, construction is expected to begin.

== Other considerations ==
The road is expected to unite the people across the border and ease access to the Port of Djibouti. This road offers the shortest access to the ocean, other that the port of Mombasa, through Uganda and Kenya.

== See also ==
- Transport in South Sudan
- List of roads in South Sudan
