= Aggrey Jaden Road =

Highway connecting Juba to South Sudan with Uganda border

Route information
- Length: 151 mi (243 km)

Major junctions
- North end: Juba
- Lainya County Yei, South Sudan Morobo County Bazi Kaya, South Sudan
- South end: Kaya, South Sudan

Location
- Country: South Sudan

Highway system
- Transport in South Sudan

Aggrey Jaden Road also known as "Juba-Yei-Morobo-Kaya Road", is a highway which connects South Sudan to the Uganda border. The road stretches from Juba which serves as the capital and the largest city in the country connection via Lainya County to Yei, Morobo and Kaya which is the border point. The road was renamed after Aggrey Jaden who was a revolutionary freedom fighter for the struggle of South Sudan independence.

== Location ==
The road starts at Juba, the capital and largest city in South Sudan. It travels in a general Southerly direction to the town of Lainya a distance of approximately 75 Miles. From there, the road travels in a general Southerly direction, though the towns of Yei and Morobo to end at Kaya town at the border with Uganda, a distance of 151 Miles.

== Upgrade to bituminous surface ==
The National Government of South Sudan has plans to upgrade the road to II Bitumen which started by Road (Bush) clearance in 2022 before Starting the Construction.
