= Emmanuel Jambo =

South Sudanese photographer

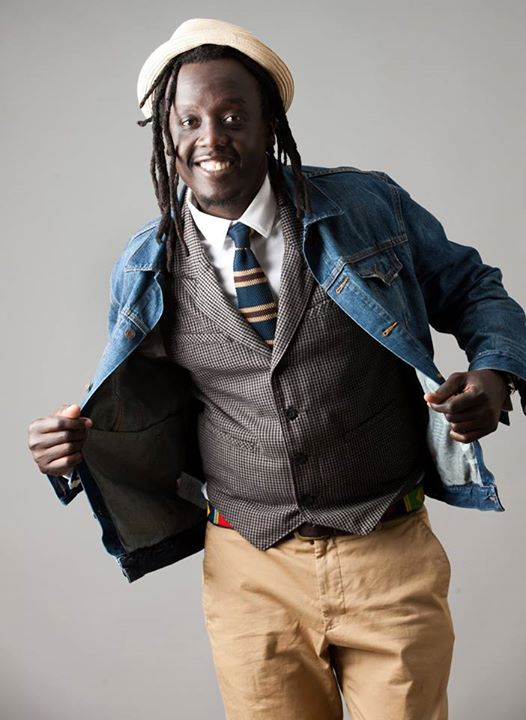

Background information
- Born: Emmanuel Jambo; 1987 (age 38–39); Juba, Sudan
- Occupations: Photographer & Managing Director at Emms Studios
- Years active: 2008–present
- Website: www.emmanueljambo.com

Emmanuel Jambo is a South Sudanese photographer based in Nairobi, Kenya. He is among the most sought after photographers in East and Central Africa and is popularly known for taking the official Kenyan president Uhuru Kenyatta's official portrait. In 2012, Emmanuel was recognized by Forbes Magazine as one of the most influential photographers in Africa, and later on named the official photographer for Kenya's President Uhuru Kenyatta.

Its always good to look for something different, that is how you make a mark for yourself. Work for the art. Be real or artistic about things, money will come. Also it's not all about equipment, investing in expensive equipment doesn't necessarily make you a better photographer.

— Emmanuel Jambo
