= Juba–Nimule Road =

Road in South Sudan

Coordinates: 04°19′24″N 32°00′46″E

Route information
- Length: 119 mi (192 km)
- History: Designated in 2007; Completion in 2012

Major junctions
- North end: Juba
- South end: Nimule

Location
- Country: South Sudan

Highway system
- Transport in South Sudan

The Juba–Nimule Road is a road in South Sudan connecting the capital city of Juba in the Eastern Equatoria and the town of Nimule in Magwi County.

== Location ==
The road starts in the city of Juba at the intersection between Dr John Garang Street, Mboro Road, Ngongi Street and Jurlika Street, at what is referred to as Custome Roundabout. From there it continues in a southeasterly direction as Highway A43, crosses the White Nile and continues as Nile Street. It then turns southwards as the Nimule Highway. This road makes a T-junction with the Torit Highway at the town of Likiberi. The road continues through Sirsiri, to end at Nimule, at the international border with Uganda. The road measures approximately 192 kilometres (119 mi), from end to end.

== Overview ==
The Juba–Nimule Road is a major primary road connecting the capital to the neighboring countries of Uganda and Kenya. The road cuts down "travel time between Juba and Nimule from eight hours to less than three hours". In addition, it provides the most cost-effective and most efficient route to the Indian Ocean port city of Mombasa in Kenya.

== Upgrade to class II bitumen standard ==
Between 2007 and 2017, the United States government, through the United States Agency for International Development (USAID), tarmacked this road, as a gift to the people of South Sudan. The work was divided into three phases. The engineering, procurement and construction (EPC) contractor was the Louis Berger Group. The EPC contractor then used its three subcontractors to implement the project: Eyat Roads and Bridges, Gulsan Insaat, and ANT Insaat. The road update was completed in 2012 and is reported to have cost US$225 million to renovate and upgrade.

== Road signs ==
The road, known as Highway A in Juba, continues into southward towards Nimule as Highway A43.

== Point of interest ==
The Juba-Nimule road traverses the Juba Nile Bridge across the White Nile, approximately 7.5 kilometres (5 mi) southeast of the city center.

== Violence ==
On 8 June 2017, a convoy carrying civilians escorted by an heavily armed SPLA united fall in the ambush of opposition forces along the Nimule-Juba highway. 14 people were killed, including high-ranking military officials allied to the regime in Juba.

== See also ==
- List of roads in South Sudan
