= Kalisto Lado =

South Sudanese lawyer and politician

Kalisto Lado is a South Sudanese lawyer and politician. He is the former mayor of the Juba City Council. He was appointed as Mayor of the JCC by the governor of Central Equatoria State, Emmanuel Adil in March 2021. He was shortly axed from his position by the state governor, Emmanuel Adil.

Kalisto also served as press secretary in the office of vice president, James Wani Igga.

== Arrest ==
In March 2024, Kalisto was arrested by security agents at his house in Juba and detained for nearly 6 months under unclear circumstances.

In August, Vice President Dr. James Wani Igga disclosed that the government ordered the arrest of the lawyer and former mayor.

In April, a month after Kalisto's arrest, his legal advocate reported being threatened by unknown security personnel asking him to withdraw a lawsuit at the East African Court of Justice, demanding the release of his colleague.

In June, a lawyer representing Kalisto at the Pan African Law Chamber revealed that the South Sudan government had charged the former mayor with attempts to overthrow the government, supplying weapons, and conspiracy.

== Release from detention ==
In September 2024, the National Security Service released Kalisto after a 6-month detention without any formal trial.
