= Freedom Bridge (South Sudan) =

- Coordinates: 4°48′39″N 31°36′13″E
- Crosses: Nile River
- Official name: Freedom Bridge

Location
- Interactive map of Freedom Bridge

The Freedom Bridge in Juba, South Sudan, is South Sudan's second permanent bridge over the Nile, the first being the Juba Nile Bridge, a Bailey type bridge built in 1976. The new bridge was officially opened on 19 May 2022.

== Overview ==
In 2012, Japan International Cooperation Agency (JICA) signed a grants agreement with the Republic of South Sudan. The grants amounted to 4.1 billion yen; approximately US$52 million. Some of the grants were used for the construction of a new bridge over the White Nile River to relieve traffic congestion in Juba and improve the transportation capacity and connectivity of South Sudan. The new proposed Freedom Bridge funded by (JICA) would be 560 meters long with sufficient width for both east and west bound traffic and a pedestrian sidewalk. The Japanese Ambassador to South Sudan said "the new bridge will serve as a reminder to the people of South Sudan to maintain peace and be free from violence." The project was put on hold at the end of 2013 due to what was effectively the outbreak of the South Sudanese civil war in the country.

On 19 March 2015, South Sudan President Salva Kiir ceremoniously broke ground in Juba on a Japanese-funded, $91-million project to build a new bridge across the River Nile. It was expected to be completed in 2018, and boost South Sudan's economy.

On 26 December 2016, The South Sudanese government called for the resumption of construction of the bridge, which would support the transport of supplies and the development of the area. Earlier in the year, Japanese aid workers evacuated the country due to a resumption of fighting in the country. Without the return of staff from the Japan International Cooperation Agency (JICA), which was building the bridge, there was no resumption of the construction in sight.

On 14 June 2017, JICA re-assured the Transitional Government of National Unity (TGoNU) of its commitment in the completion of the suspended projects, like the Japanese-funded construction of Freedom Bridge along the Nile and the project for provision of clean water in Juba, which had been suspended until peace was restored and security improved in the country. In November 2021, the Japanese resident engineer Omeda Norio told reporters that the Freedom Bridge would be opened on 5 July 2022.

On 19 May 2022, during the opening of the Freedom Bridge, those involved were the President Salva Kiir, Vice-President Riek Machar, AU infrastructure envoy Raila Amollo Odinga and as well as the head of the Japan International Cooperation Agency Akihiko Tanaka who made his first overseas visit since assuming office

Juba County announced a lighting project to boost nighttime security and road security on October 23rd 2026. A few days later, the bridge illuminated for the first time during a weekend test of its newly installed lighting system. Juba Caretaker Commissioner Kalisto Lado said additional streetlights are expected to be installed along the bridge to improve visibility for motorists and pedestrians after dark.
