= Emmanuel Khamis =

South Sudanese politician

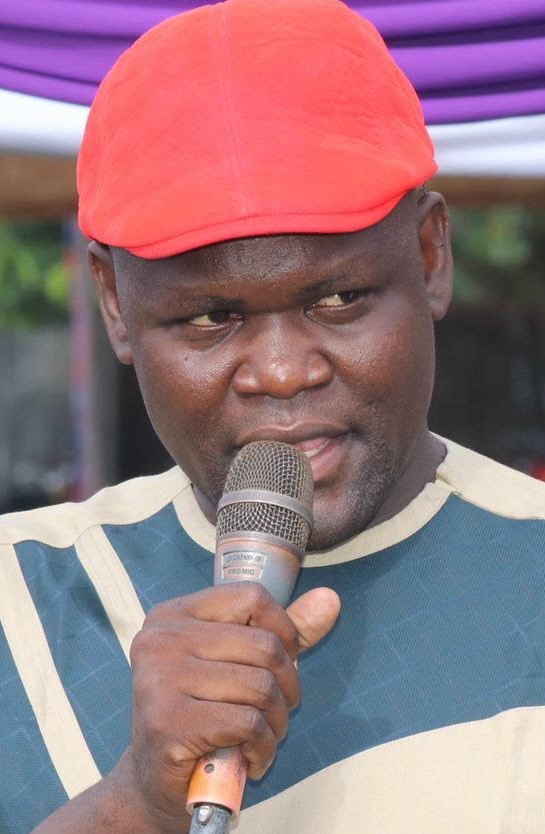
Khamis in 2023

Emmanuel Khamis Richard is a South-Sudanese politician. He was the Acting Mayor of Juba City Council before being sacked for assaulting a female street vendor. He is the Commissioner for Lainya County in Central Equatoria in the Revitalised Transitional Government of National Unity as of 2023.

== Biography ==
Khamis as the Commissioner of Kupera County, and was appointed as Commissioner for Lainya County, in Central Equatoria in the Revitalised Transitional Government of National Unity, through a decree by President Salva Kiir in February 2021 when the unity government was formed. Khamis was also appointed as caretaker Mayor for the municipal council on July 27 by Central Equatoria State Governor, Emmanuel Adil Anthony through a gubernatorial decree. He replaced Michael Lado Allah-Jabu.

In May 2023, Khamis appealed to holdout groups in the area to return home and help in restoring peace in the country. In the same month of May, he also removed about six check points previously erected along the Juba-Lainya-Yei Road hindering effective movement of pedestrians and travellers plying the highway.

However, in September 2023, the Transitional National Legislative Assembly (TNLA) recommended the instant removal of Emmanuel Khamis as the acting mayor of Juba City Council (JCC) for assaulting a female street vendor. The incident, which was captured in a video that went viral on social media, showed Khamis wielding a pistol in his right hand and physically assaulting a female vendor selling mosquito nets at the Seventh-day Adventist roundabout. He was sacked in September 2023.
