= Tuti Bridge =

Bridge in Sudan

Coordinates: 15°36′30″N 32°30′45″E

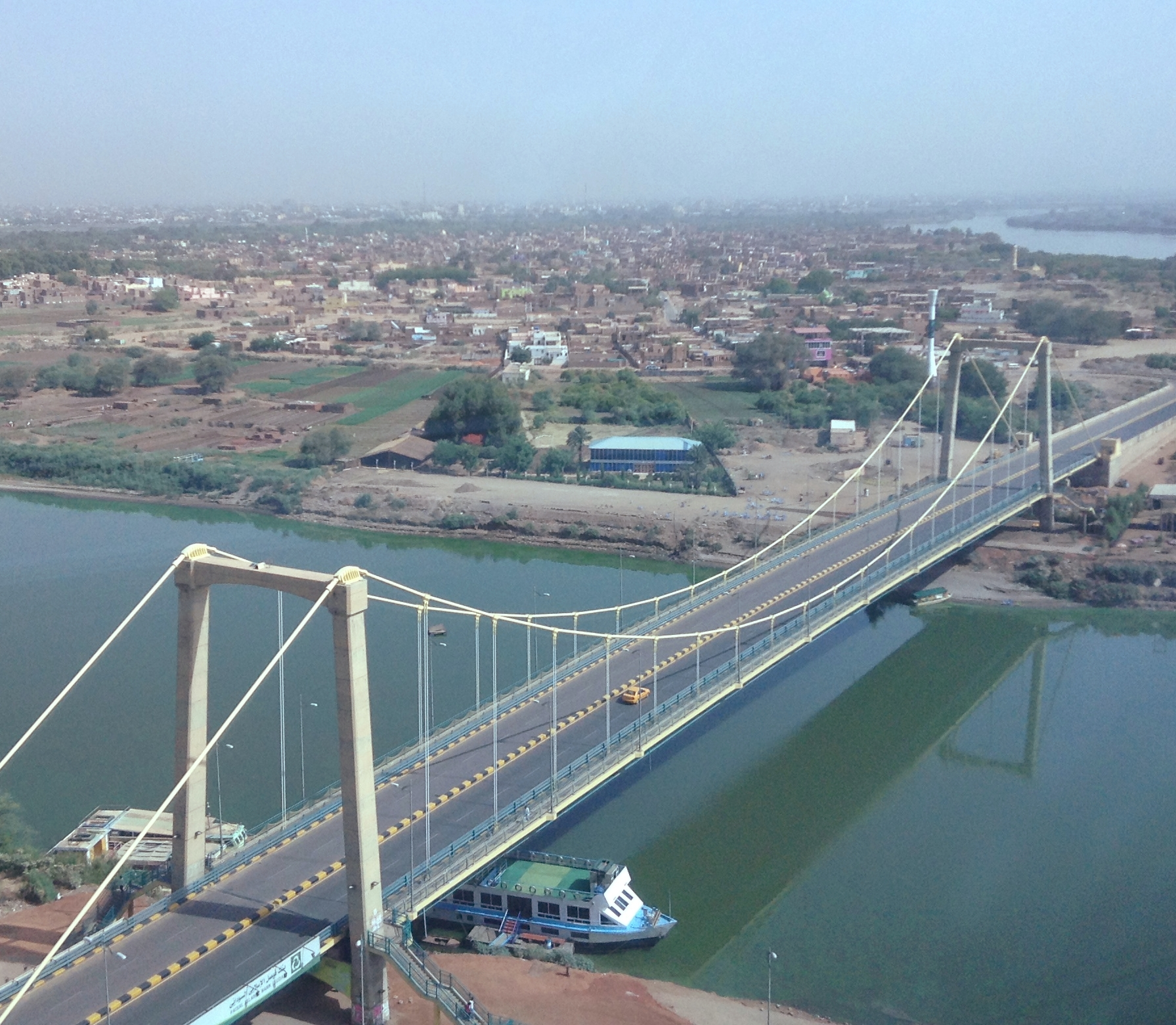
Tuti Bridge

The Tuti Bridge (Arabic: جسر توتي) is a modern suspension bridge linking between Tuti Island and the City of Khartoum in Sudan that was completed in February 2008. In the past the only approach to Tuti Island was via ferries but thanks to the Tuti-Khartoum Bridge, easy access to the island is possible.

The bridge is considered to be the first suspension bridge to be constructed in Sudan and one of the first constructed in Africa. The concept design of the bridge was proposed by Alfatih Ahmed, with the final working design by A&A Company Its construction depended on new bridge technology, enabling the erection to be carried out using local expertise and equipment.

The Tuti-Khartoum Bridge is the first among a series of bridges that will connect the cities of Khartoum, Omdurman and Bahri (North Khartoum), and will help to alleviate traffic throughout the cities. The development has immediately commercialised the previously isolated Tuti Island.
