= Mashreq University =

Private university in Khartoum, Sudan

- Type: Private
- Established: 2003
- Location: Khartoum North, Sudan
- Campus: Urban
- Website: University website

Mashreq University is a private university located in Khartoum North in Sudan. Started in 2003 as Al-Mashreq College for Science and Technology, it was granted full university status in 2010 by the Sudanese Ministry of Higher Education and Scientific Research.

The university offers more than 29 study programs, including Medicine and Laboratory Sciences, Engineering, Information Technology, Media, Economics, and Business Administration.

English was the language of instruction in Sudanese universities, but since the early 1990s all curricula have been Arabized in Sudanese colleges; Mashreq University teaches in English and Arabic.
