= Shambat Bridge =

Bridge in Sudan destroyed in 2023

Coordinates: 15°38′39″N 32°30′24″E

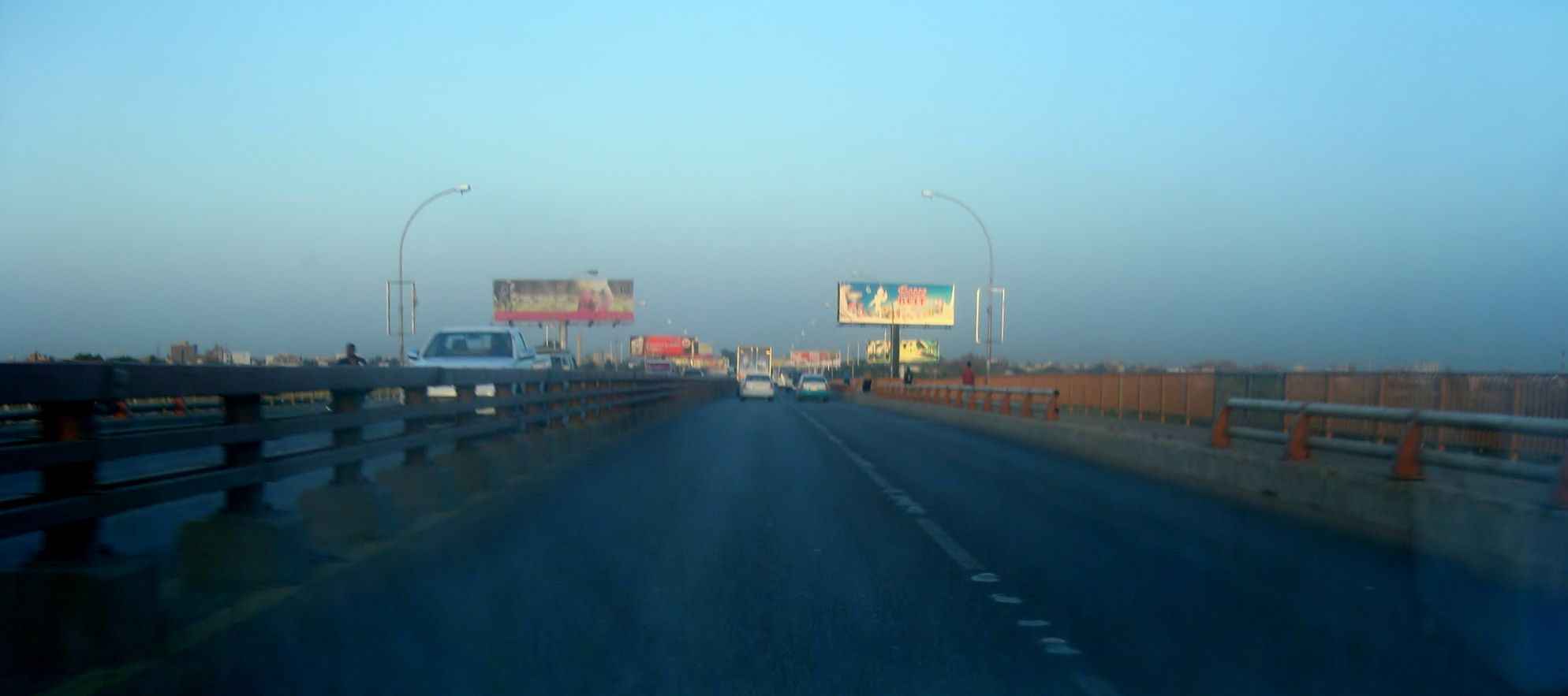
The Shambat Bridge in 2012

The Shambat Bridge was a bridge in Sudan which crossed the Nile connecting Omdurman to Khartoum North.

== History ==
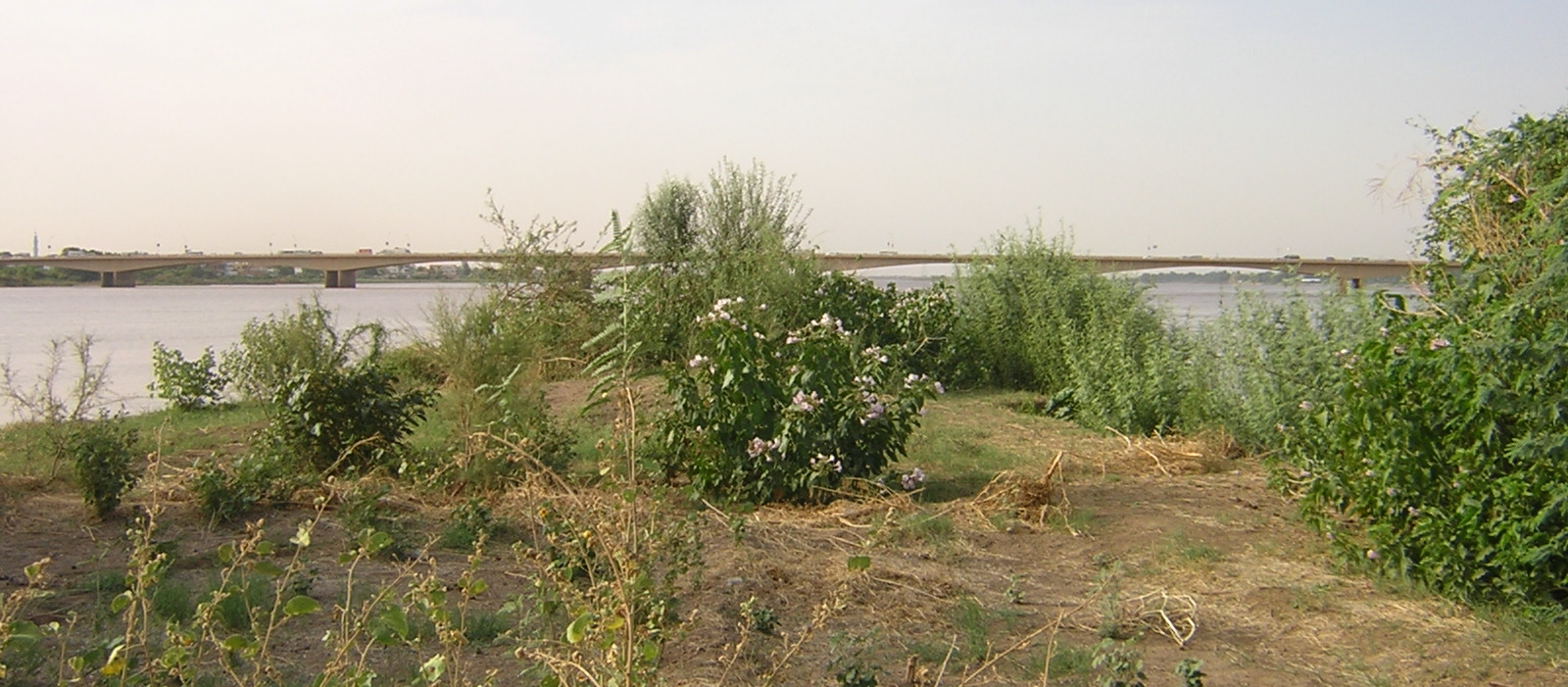
The view of the bridge from the confluence of White and Blue Nile from Tuti Island

The bridge was built from 1963 to 1966 by the Italian company Recchi. It was the first prestressed concrete bridge built abroad by an Italian company.

On 11 November 2023, the bridge was destroyed amid intense fighting in the Battle of Khartoum. The Sudanese Armed Forces and the Rapid Support Forces blamed each other for its destruction.
