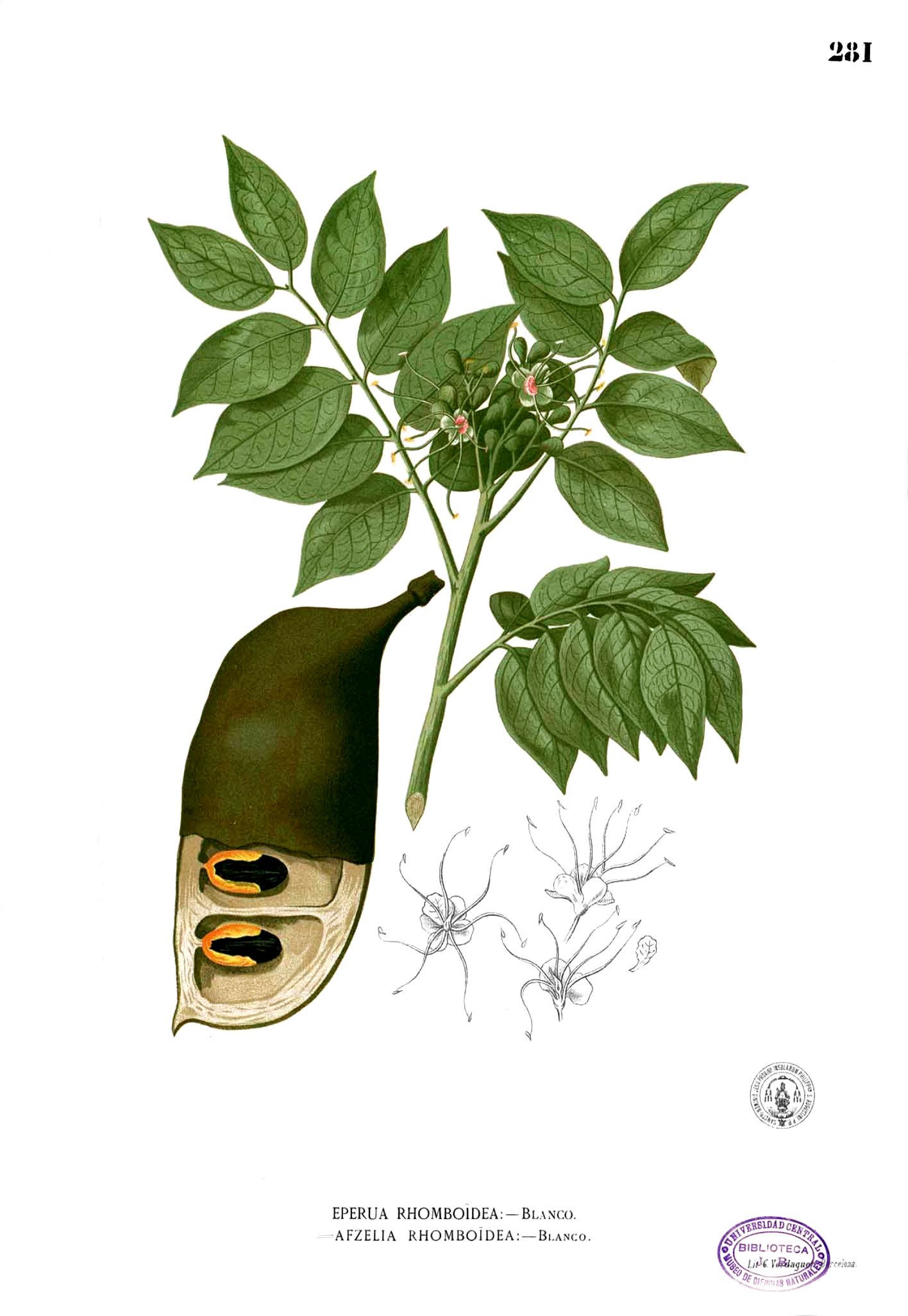

Conservation status
- Vulnerable (IUCN 2.3)

Scientific classification
- Kingdom: Plantae
- Clade: Embryophytes
- Clade: Tracheophytes
- Clade: Angiosperms
- Clade: Eudicots
- Clade: Rosids
- Order: Fabales
- Family: Fabaceae
- Genus: Afzelia
- Species: A. rhomboidea

Binomial name
- Afzelia rhomboidea (Blanco) Fern.-Vill.

Synonyms
- Afzelia acuminata (Merr.) Harms; Afzelia borneensis Harms; Eperua rhomboidea Blanco; Intsia acuminata Merr. Intsia rhombodea (Blanco) Kuntze; Pahudia acuminata Merr. Pahudia borneensis (Harms) Merr. Pahudia rhomboidea (Blanco) Prain

= Afzelia rhomboidea =

Species of plant

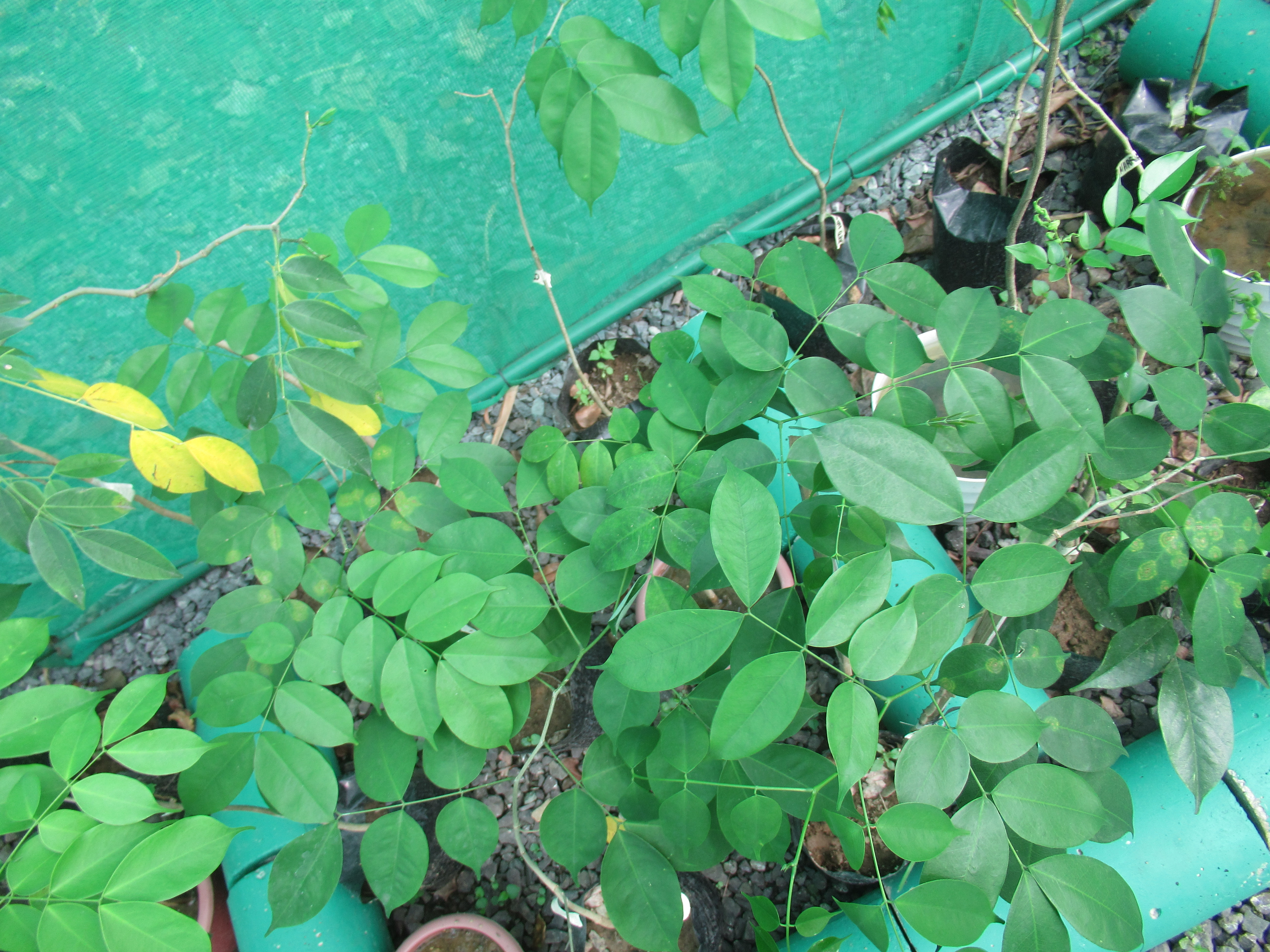
Tindalo Afzelia rhomboidea seedling (Philippines)

Afzelia rhomboidea is a species of plant in the family Fabaceae. It is native to Borneo, Java, the Philippines, and Sumatra. It is threatened by habitat loss.
