= Tuti Island =

Sudanese island

Tuti Island Arabic: توتي, romanized: Tutiy
- Island
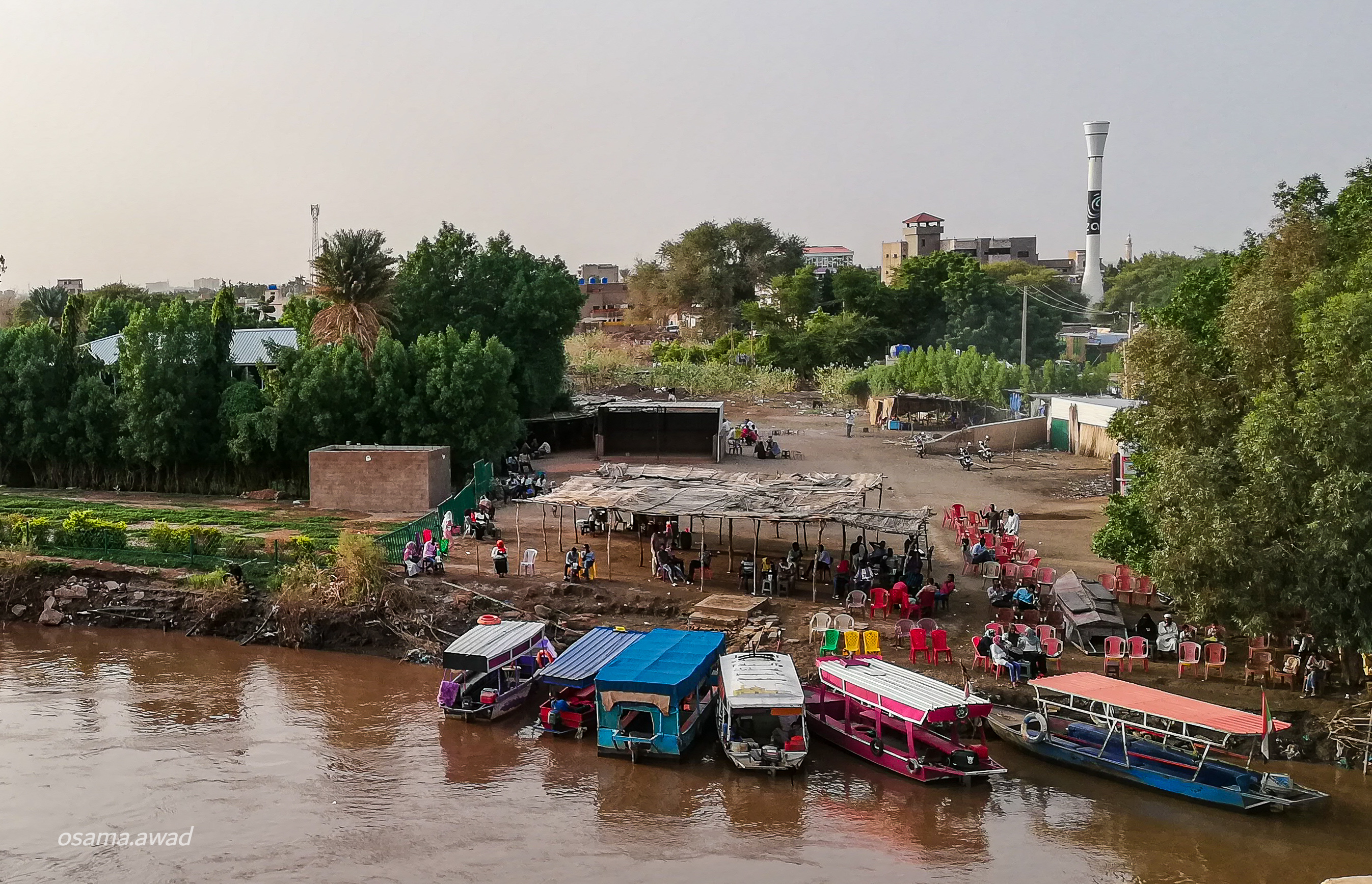
- Tuti Island

- Location within Sudan
- Country: Sudan
- State: Khartoum
- Time zone: UTC+2:00 (CAT)

Tuti Island (also spelled Tutti Island; Arabic: توتي, romanized: Tutiy) is an island in Sudan where the White Nile and Blue Nile merge to form the main Nile. It is surrounded by the "Three Towns": Khartoum (the capital of Sudan), Omdurman (the largest city in Sudan), and Khartoum North (also known as Bahri, a large industrial center). Despite this, Tuti is home to only one small village (founded in the late 15th century), with grassland being the main makeup of the island. In the past the only approach to Tuti Island was via several ferries that cross the river intermittently, but the Tuti Bridge, a modern suspension bridge, was completed in 2008 and can be used instead. The island area is 3.99 square kilometres (1.54 sq mi).

Tuti Island is mainly agricultural and where Khartoum gets most of its supply of fruits and vegetables. Several farms are situated all around the island, many of them still using manual methods of farming. Green fields and lime groves are also present.

Following the outbreak of the Sudanese Civil War in April 2023, the Rapid Support Forces (RSF) converted the island into what was effectively an open-air prison. By October 2024, nearly all 30,000 inhabitants of Tuti had fled, with the exception of around 50 people. The island was retaken by the Sudanese Armed Forces (SAF) in March 2025.

== Lifestyle ==
The ca. 4 km^{2} (1.5 sq mi) of land on the island are covered in citrus orchards, vegetable farms, gorse hedgerows and narrow muddy lanes where donkeys and rickshaws are the main source of transport.

The building of the Tuti Bridge has sparked development projects on Tuti Island, primarily by Tuti Island Investment Company, which plans to turn the Island into a state of the art tourist resort. These ideas have caused controversy, with the locals wishing to protect their village from becoming a tourist destination.

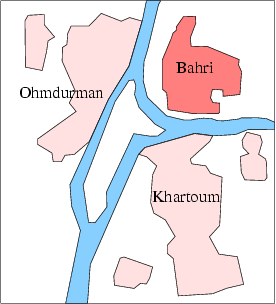
Tuti Island between the three cities of Bahri, Omdurman, and Khartoum

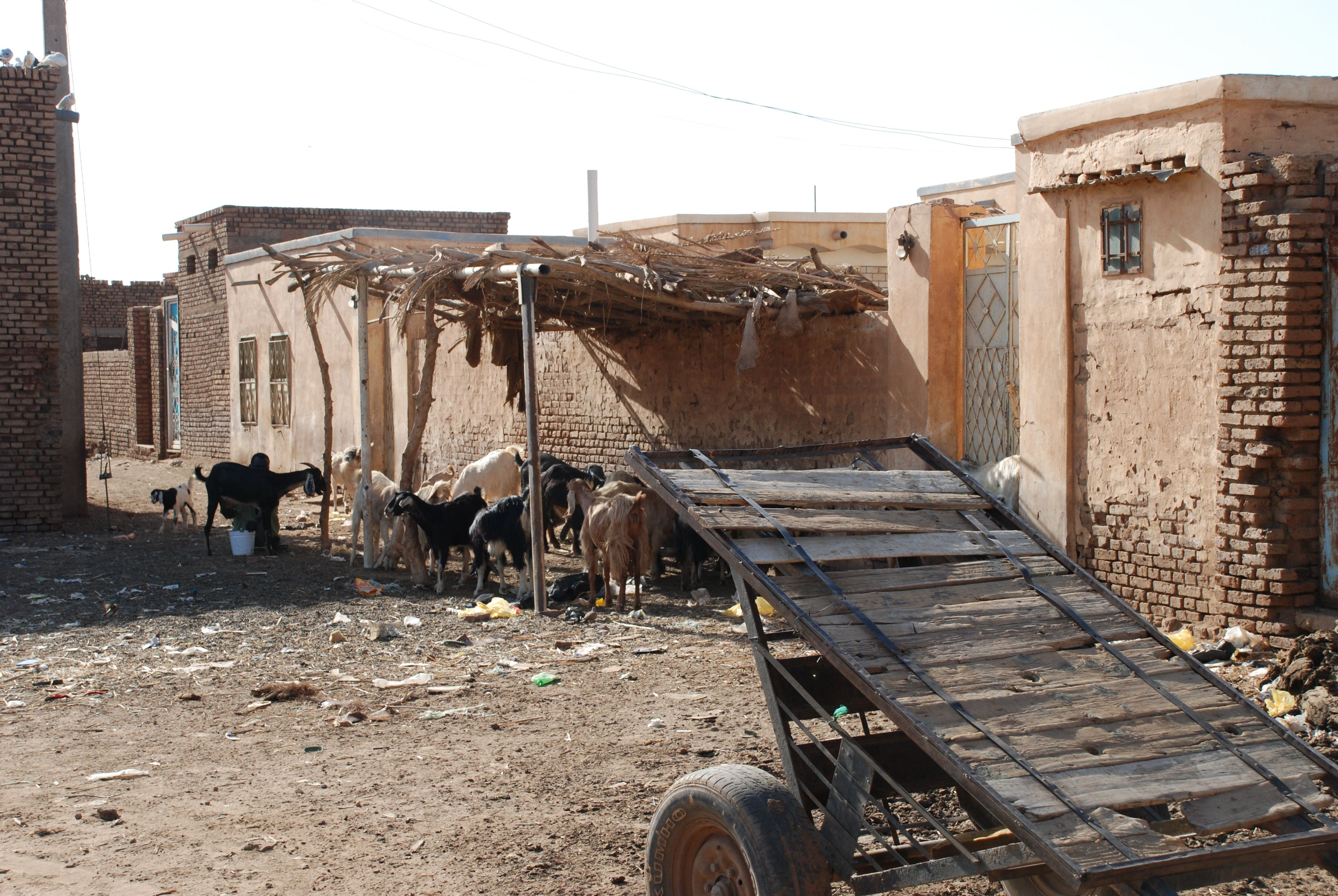
Village on Tuti Island
