= Kober Bridge =

Road bridge in Khartoum, Sudan

Coordinates: 15°37′01″N 32°33′17″E

Kober Bridge (Arabic: كوبرى كوبر, Kubri Kūbir) is a bridge for road traffic that links the neighbourhood of al-Riadh in Khartoum with Kafouri in the industrial city Khartoum North across the Blue Nile in central Sudan. Named after the adjacent neighbourhood Kober (from Cooper, the first director of Kober prison at the beginning of the 1900s) in Khartoum North, it is also called "Armed Forces Bridge" and was opened on 23 October 2014.
