= Juba Nile Bridge =

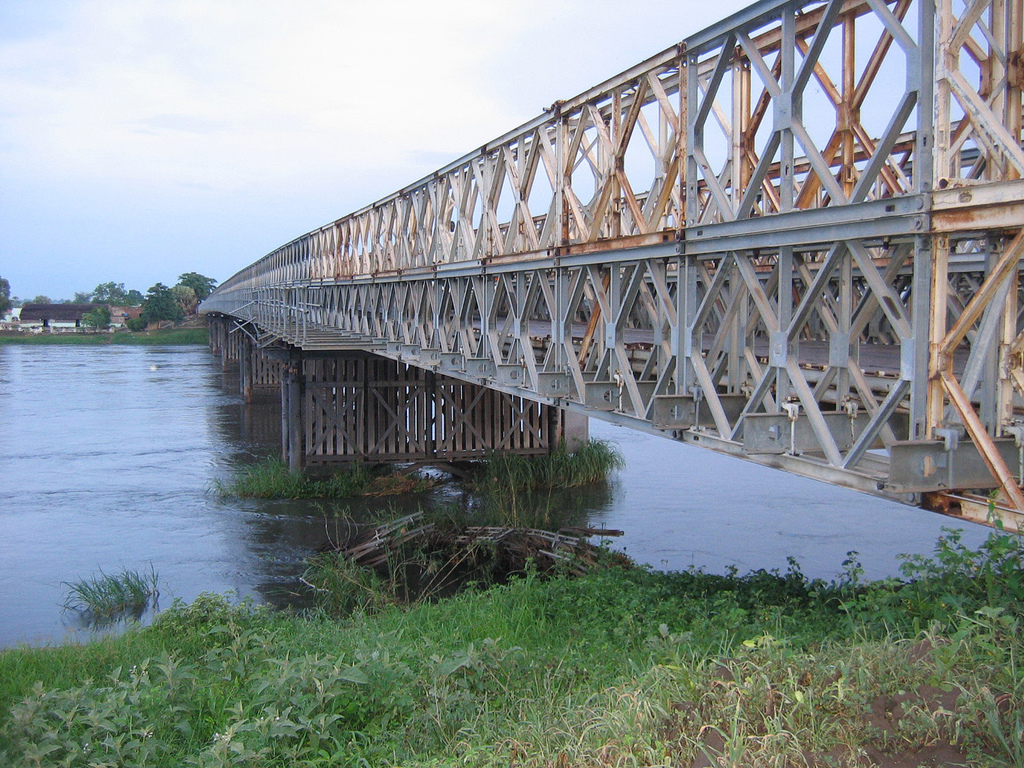
- steel bridge over white Nile
- Coordinates: 4.8230°N 31.6086°E
- Carries: Juba-Nimule Road
- Crosses: Nile River
- Locale: Juba, Jubek State

Location
- Interactive map of Juba Nile Bridge

The Juba Nile Bridge is composed of two adjacent 252 meter spans over the White Nile in Juba, South Sudan, on the Juba-Nimule Road, and until 2022 provided the only access over the River Nile to South Sudan. It was built in 1972 during the regime of General Gaafar Nimeiry, from two World War II era bridges, costing $2.5 million at the time. It was re-opened in January 2012 after major repair works following an accident in 2010 which left one lane of the bridge unusable for heavy vehicles. A new bridge, the Freedom Bridge, costing over 92 million dollars, was opened in 2022 a small distance upstream.

== History ==
The original Nile bridge crossing at Juba was built in 1974 by the Dutch construction company De Groot International under a United Nations programme. The United Nations High Commissioner for Refugees paid about one million dollar. The total cost of the bridge was 2.5 million. The Dutch government put up the remaining 1.5 million. On 15 March 1974 it was opened by general Gaafar Nimeiry. Up until that time an irregular ferry service was the only way to cross the Nile river for hundreds of miles. After the Sudan civil war the United Nations Commissioner For Refugees asked for help from the Dutch government. The "Rijkswaterstaat Directie Bruggen" was asked to design a bridge and they came up with a practical design using World War II-era Bailey bridge material. The design for the bridge with six 43 meter spans also included walkways to the left and right, five pillars driven into the granite substrate, the landends and the road leading up to the bridge. More than 600 tons of steel, parts of a floating crane, a drilling rig and a bulldozer and a complete field kitchen and medical unit were transported to the site. The materials were shipped around the Cape and driven into Sudan from neighbouring Kenya. From the first order until the transport leaving the port of Rotterdam took 7 weeks, the transport took 10 weeks, and the total construction time on site was 14 weeks. One reason this tight schedule was a success was the setting up of a sober "campsite" where the 18 Dutch construction workers lived, working closely with locals to get the job done.

Following the collapse of one of the bridges due to hostilities, two replacement 252-metre Mabey Compact 200 bridges were installed in 2006. In 2010, one of these two Juba Nile Bridges was damaged, leaving it completely unusable for heavy vehicles. The bridges provided the only access over the Nile into much of South Sudan, since most goods and foodstuffs imported from Kenya and Uganda passed over the Juba-Nimule Road.

As of result of South Sudan's becoming an independent nation in 2011, newly elected president Salva Kiir made the repair of the Juba Nile Bridges one of his government's priorities during the administration's first 100 days. Funding for the repair was provided by the United States Agency for International Development (USAID) under the Accelerated Infrastructure Program, a cooperative agreement with the United Nations Office for Project Services (UNOPS). A new bridge, the Freedom Bridge has been constructed by a Japanese company and after several delays and was opened in 2022.

A local construction firm started the repair works in December 2010, fully reopening the bridge in mid-January 2012, ahead of the scheduled February completion date.

In October 2021 a new repair effort was made to ease travel to Juba.
