= Blue Nile Road and Railway Bridge =

Bridge in Khartoum, Sudan

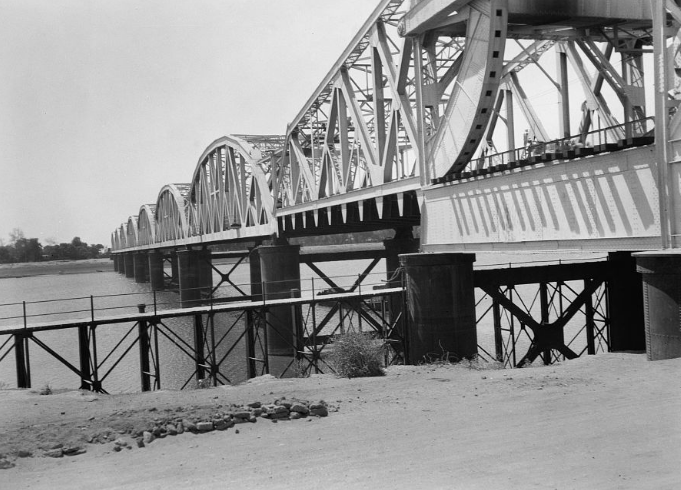
- Coordinates: 15°36′57″N 32°32′38″E
- Carries: Road and railway
- Crosses: Blue Nile
- Locale: Sudan

Characteristics
- Design: Bascule bridge
- Total length: 560 m

History
- Constructed by: Cleveland Bridge & Engineering Company
- Opened: 1909

The Blue Nile Road and Railway Bridge is a bascule bridge in Sudan, which links the capital Khartoum to the industrial city Khartoum North across the Blue Nile.

== History ==
Built between 1907 and 1909 by Cleveland Bridge & Engineering Company from a design by engineer Georges Imbault, it is one of the oldest bridges in Khartoum and Sudan.
