= Shambat (city) =

City in Khartoum State, Sudan

Coordinates: 15°40′N 32°32′E

Shambat is a neighborhood of Khartoum North in Khartoum State, Sudan.

The University of Khartoum and the Sudan University of Science and Technology have agriculture campuses in Shambat.

== Climate ==
Climate data for Shambat (1991–2020)
Month	Jan	Feb	Mar	Apr	May	Jun	Jul	Aug	Sep	Oct	Nov	Dec	Year
Record high °C (°F)	41.5 (106.7)	42.0 (107.6)	45.5 (113.9)	46.5 (115.7)	47.3 (117.1)	46.3 (115.3)	45.0 (113.0)	43.7 (110.7)	44.5 (112.1)	43.1 (109.6)	41.0 (105.8)	38.5 (101.3)	47.3 (117.1)
Mean daily maximum °C (°F)	30.5 (86.9)	33.0 (91.4)	36.5 (97.7)	40.2 (104.4)	41.9 (107.4)	41.5 (106.7)	38.9 (102.0)	36.9 (98.4)	38.8 (101.8)	39.2 (102.6)	34.9 (94.8)	31.7 (89.1)	37.0 (98.6)
Daily mean °C (°F)	22.3 (72.1)	24.4 (75.9)	27.4 (81.3)	31.0 (87.8)	33.6 (92.5)	34.1 (93.4)	32.6 (90.7)	31.2 (88.2)	32.4 (90.3)	31.8 (89.2)	27.6 (81.7)	23.9 (75.0)	29.4 (84.9)
Mean daily minimum °C (°F)	14.2 (57.6)	15.9 (60.6)	18.3 (64.9)	21.7 (71.1)	25.4 (77.7)	26.7 (80.1)	26.3 (79.3)	25.6 (78.1)	25.9 (78.6)	24.4 (75.9)	20.2 (68.4)	16.1 (61.0)	21.7 (71.1)
Record low °C (°F)	7.0 (44.6)	5.5 (41.9)	10.0 (50.0)	12.2 (54.0)	15.0 (59.0)	20.5 (68.9)	19.0 (66.2)	17.5 (63.5)	19.0 (66.2)	15.5 (59.9)	11.0 (51.8)	6.0 (42.8)	5.5 (41.9)
Average precipitation mm (inches)	0.0 (0.0)	0.0 (0.0)	0.0 (0.0)	0.2 (0.01)	4.7 (0.19)	2.1 (0.08)	27.6 (1.09)	50.7 (2.00)	23.2 (0.91)	7.7 (0.30)	0.0 (0.0)	0.0 (0.0)	116.2 (4.57)
Average precipitation days (≥ 1 mm)	0.0	0.0	0.0	0.1	0.7	0.5	2.8	4.4	2.4	1.1	0.0	0.0	11.8
Average relative humidity (%)	30	24	19	17	22	28	42	50	42	32	28	31	30
Mean monthly sunshine hours	300.7	271.6	297.6	288.0	279.0	243.0	232.5	226.3	240.0	288.3	300.0	300.7	3,267.7
Source: NOAA
