= Transport in South Sudan =

== Railways ==
Railways in South Sudan.

total: 248 km (154 mi)
narrow gauge: 248 km (154 mi) 3 ft 6 in (1,067 mm) gauge.

South Sudan has a total of 248 kilometers (154 mi) of narrow-gauge, single-track railroad line in the country. The only line in the country is partially used and it connects to Babonosa (north Sudan) with Wau. Most of the line was mined and badly destroyed during the Second Sudanese Civil War. Around January 27, 2008; the line was fully rehabilitated with United Nations funds.

=== Railway links with adjacent countries ===
- Sudan – yes – Babanusa to Wau line - (1959-1962, 2010–present)

== Highways ==
Under Sudanese rule a number of main gravel roads radiating from Juba were improved. These included roads to the towns southwest of Juba and a road to the Ugandan border. In addition, the government built a gravel all-weather road east of Juba that reaches the Kenyan border. There it joined an all-weather Kenyan road to Lodwar connecting it to the Kenyan road system. However, all of these improvements radiating from Juba have been vitiated by the civil war, as the roads have been extensively mined by the SPLA and the bridges destroyed. Because roads have not been maintained, they have seriously deteriorated.

Highways in South Sudan are almost entirely unpaved. Rehabilitation work is underway and the first paved highway between the country's capital Juba and Nimule on the Uganda border has opened.

=== Inventory ===
The total road network in 2017, according to the UNJLC, consisted of:

Total: 000 kilometres (0 mi) Paved: 000 kilometres (0 mi) Unpaved: 000 kilometres (0 mi) (2017)

=== Roadways ===
- Juba-Nimule Road
- Gulu–Nimule Road

=== Regional highways ===
==== North-South ====
Primary Highways of South Sudan
Title	Start point	Intermediate points	End point	Road type
A43	Nymlal	Wau A44, B38, B41; Mundri West A44; Juba	Nimule (border with Uganda)	Gravel

==== East-West ====
Primary Highways of South Sudan
Title	Start point	Intermediate points	End point	Road type
A44	Wau A44, B38, B41	-	Mundri West A43	Gravel

== Waterways ==
The Nile river is navigable only on some stretches.

The White Nile is a navigable waterway from the Lake Albert (Africa) to Khartoum through Jebel Aulia Dam, only between Juba and Uganda requires the river upgrade or channel to make it navigable.

During part of the year the rivers are navigable up to Gambela, Ethiopia, and Wau, South Sudan.

== Pipelines ==
A single pipeline leads from South Sudan's oil fields to (north) Sudan's only seaport, Port Sudan.

== Air ==
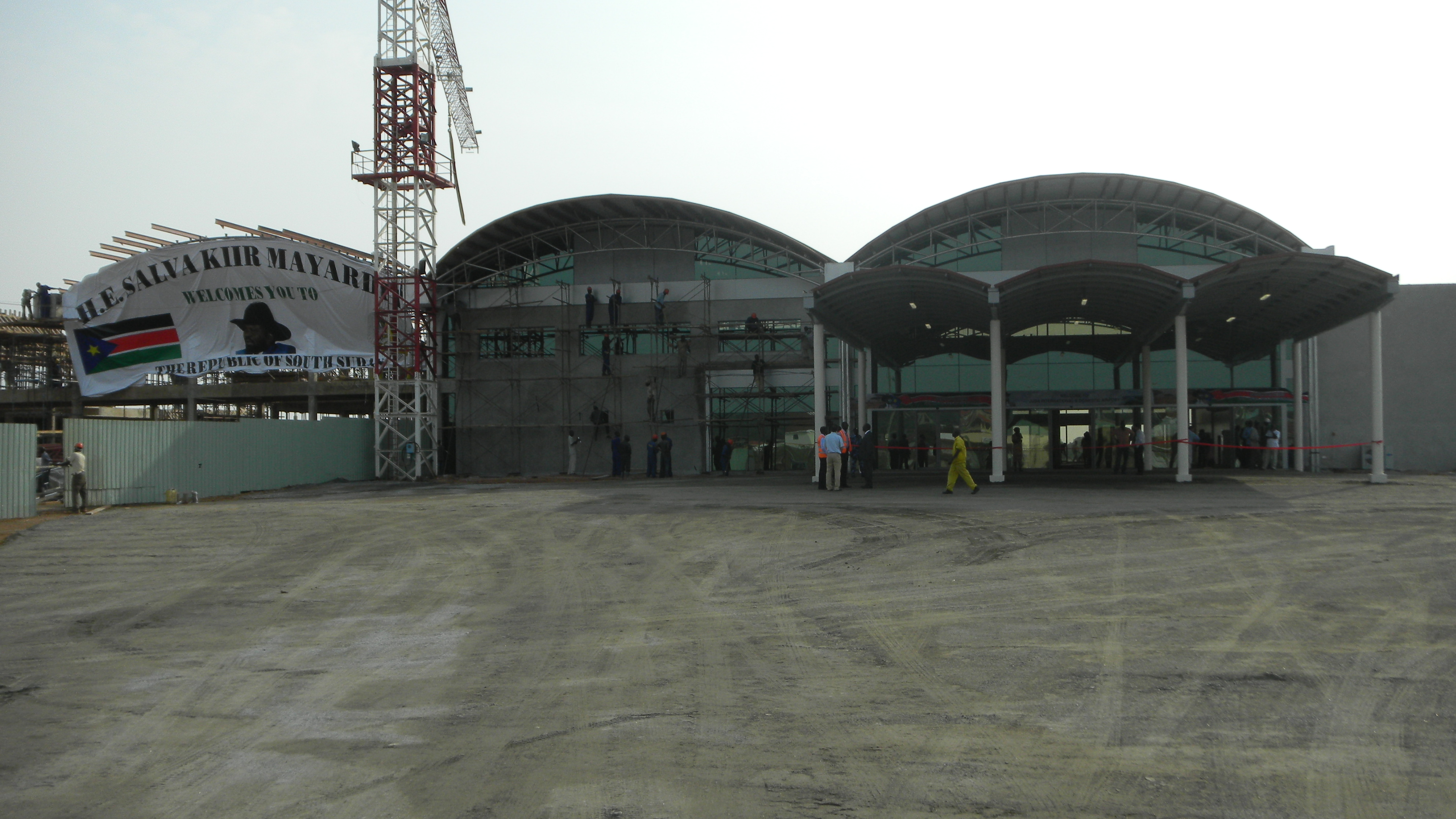
Juba International Airport

The busiest and most developed airport in South Sudan is Juba International Airport, which has regular international connections to Entebbe, Nairobi, Cairo, Addis Ababa, and Khartoum. Juba Airport is also the home base of Feeder Airlines Company. Other international airports include Malakal, with international flights to Addis Ababa and Khartoum; Wau, with weekly service to Khartoum; and Rumbek, also with weekly flights to Khartoum.

There are several smaller airports throughout South Sudan, the majority of which consist of little more than dirt airstrips.

=== Airports - with paved runways ===
total:
over 3,047 m (10,000 ft): 0
1,524 to 2,437 m (5,000 to 8,000 ft): 0
914 to 1,523 m (3,000 to 5,000 ft): (2017 est.)

=== Airports - with unpaved runways ===
total: 0
1,524 to 2,437 m (5,000 to 8,000 ft): 0
914 to 1,523 m (3,000 to 5,000 ft): 0
under 914 m (3,000 ft): 0 (2017 est.)

== See also ==
- Ministry of Transport and Roads (South Sudan)
- Lamu Port and Lamu-Southern Sudan-Ethiopia Transport Corridor
