= Khartoum North =

Khartoum North الخرطوم بحري
- City
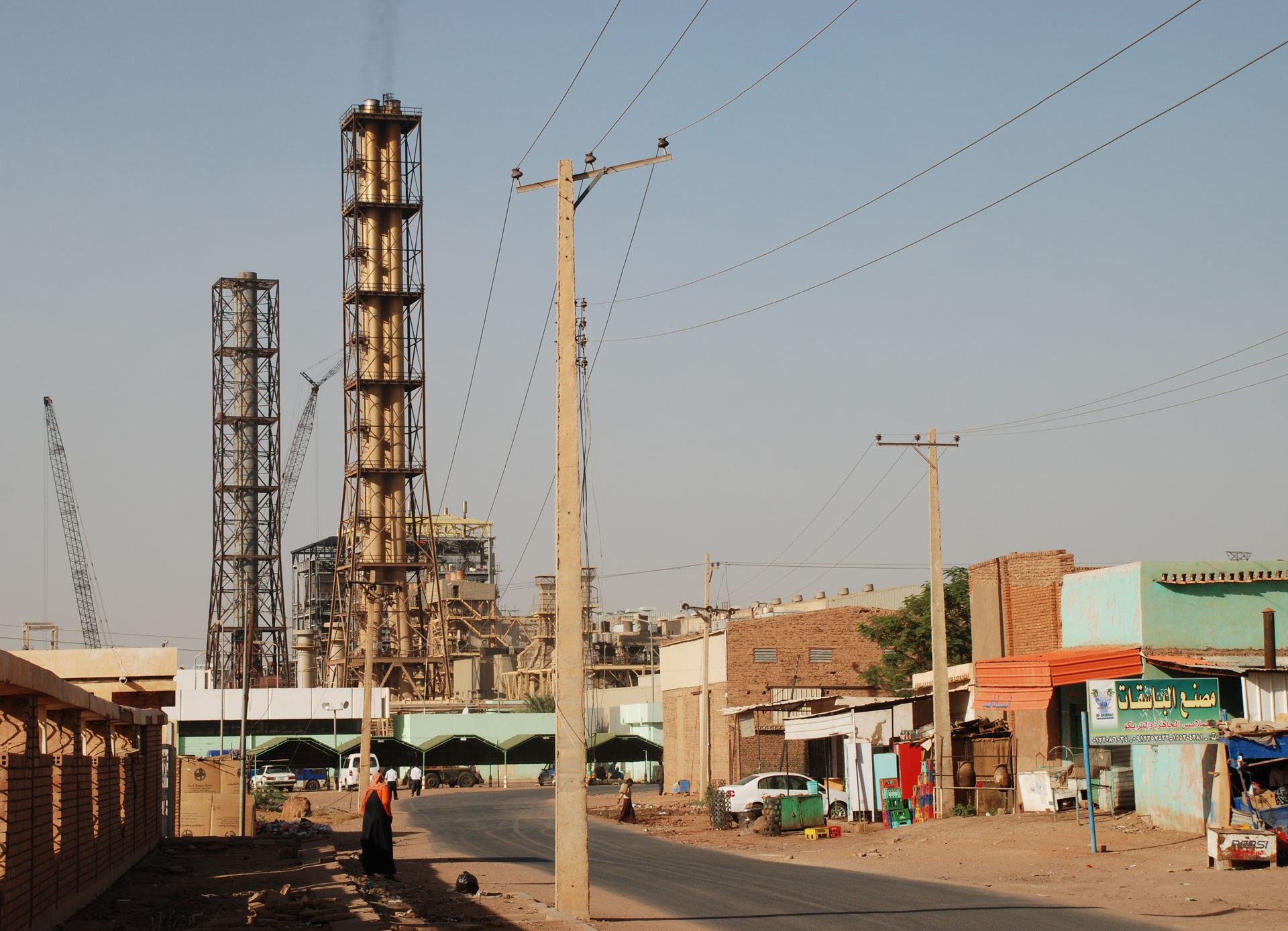
- Industrial area of Khartoum North

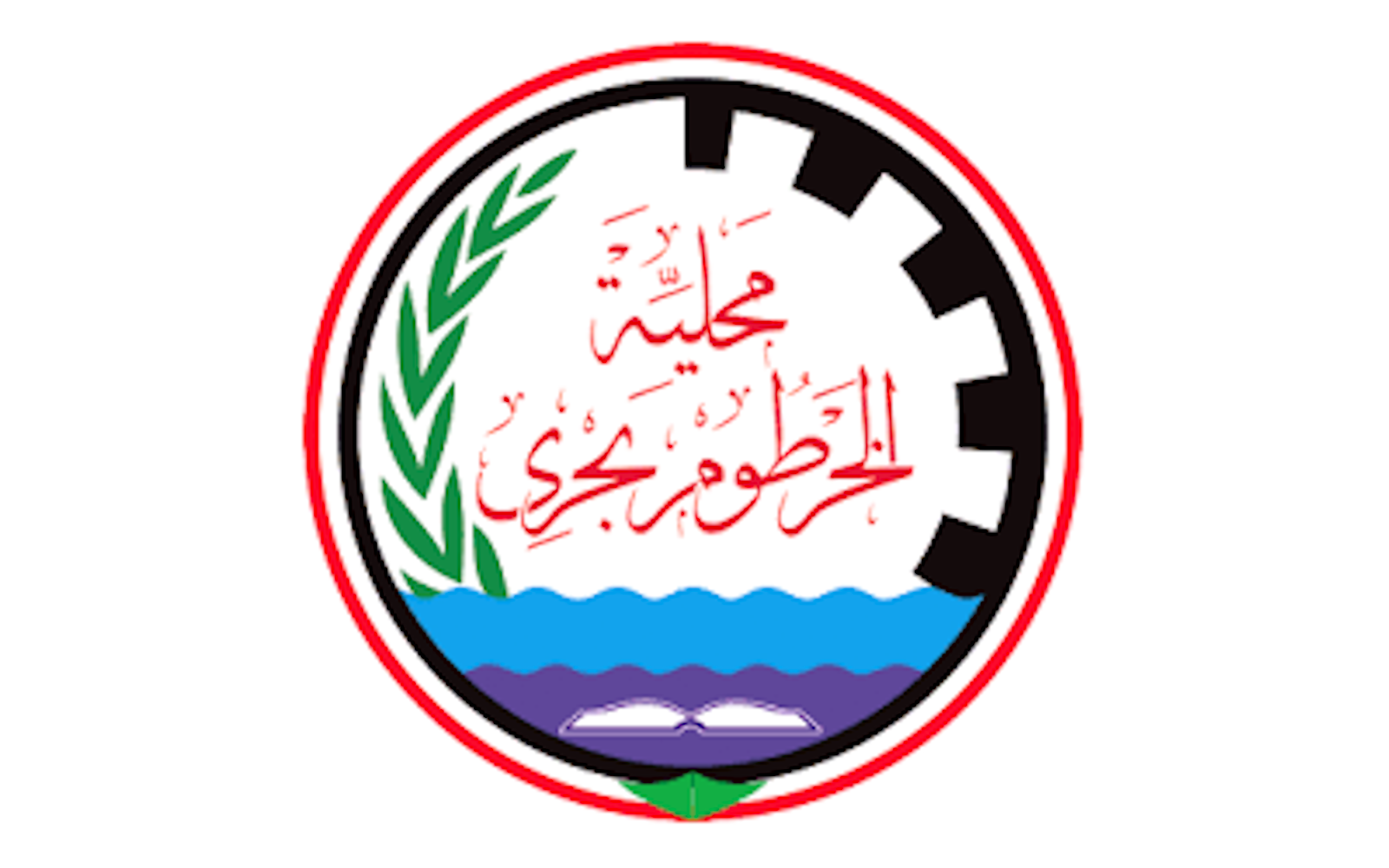
- Flag
- Nickname: Bahri
- Location in Sudan and Africa Khartoum North (Africa)
- Coordinates: 15°39′00″N 32°32′45″E
- Country: Sudan
- State: Khartoum

Population (2008)
  - Total: 1,012,211
- Time zone: UTC+2 (Central Africa Time)

Khartoum North, or Khartoum Bahri or simply Bahri (Arabic: الخرطوم بحري, romanized: al-Kharṭūm Baḥrī), is a city in Khartoum State, lying to the north of Khartoum city, the capital of Sudan. It has a population of 1,012,211 people, making it the third-largest city proper in Sudan, behind the neighbouring cities of Omdurman and Khartoum.

== Geography ==
It is located on the north bank of the Blue Nile, and the east bank of the River Nile, near the confluence of the Blue Nile with the White. Until 2023, the Shambat Bridge connected it with Omdurman to its west. Another major bridge links it with Khartoum to the south.

It was part of a three-city agglomeration (with Khartoum proper and Omdurman) with a combined population of 4,272,728 in 2008.

== Demographics ==
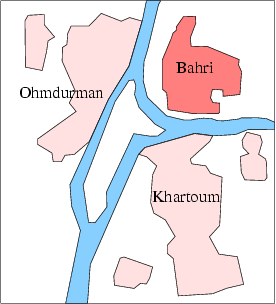
Location of Khartoum North

Year	Population
1956	39,100
1973	150,989
1983	341,155
1993	700,887
2008 Census	1,012,211

== History ==
The original settlement was the largest in the area of the Nile confluence before the Egyptians established Khartoum as their military garrison and administrative centre in the 1820s. It was eclipsed by Egyptian Khartoum, its Mahdist replacement Omdurman, and the British refounding of Khartoum following their reconquest of the country in 1898. However, Khartoum North began to grow again as the southern terminus of the Sudan Military Railroad, completed in 1899. The Blue Nile was bridged in 1910, and the line extended to Sennar, but Khartoum North continued to serve as the central railroad station and yard.

On August 20, 1998, the Al-Shifa pharmaceutical factory was destroyed by a cruise missile after the United States accused the factory of making VX (nerve agent) for al-Qaeda.

The city was captured by the Rapid Support Forces in 2023 during the opening stages of the Sudanese civil war (2023–present) before being retaken by the Sudanese Armed Forces in February 2025 as part of the 2024–2025 Bahri offensive.

== Economy ==
The area is the industrial centre of the region and the country. It contains dockyards, marine and rail workshops, and sawmills. Khartoum North trades in cotton, grains, fruit, and livestock; industries include tanning, brewing, brickmaking, textile weaving, and food processing. After 2000, chemical plants supplying household products to the rest of the country were built there.

A wealthy suburb emerged towards the eastern part of the neighbourhood, along the Blue Nile.

== Neighbourhoods ==
Khartoum North has many neighbourhoods, including:

- Alamlaak
- Kober
- Kafouri
- Bahri Industrial Area
- Al Haj Yousif
- Al Sababi
- Al Dnagla North
- Al Dnagla South
- Hilat Hamad
- Hilat Khojali
- Hilat Koko
- Alshabia North
- Alshabia South
- Almazad
- Almugtaribin
- Almerghania
- Alsafia
- Shambat
- Khoglab
- Alqadisia
- Al-Durushab

== Infrastructure ==
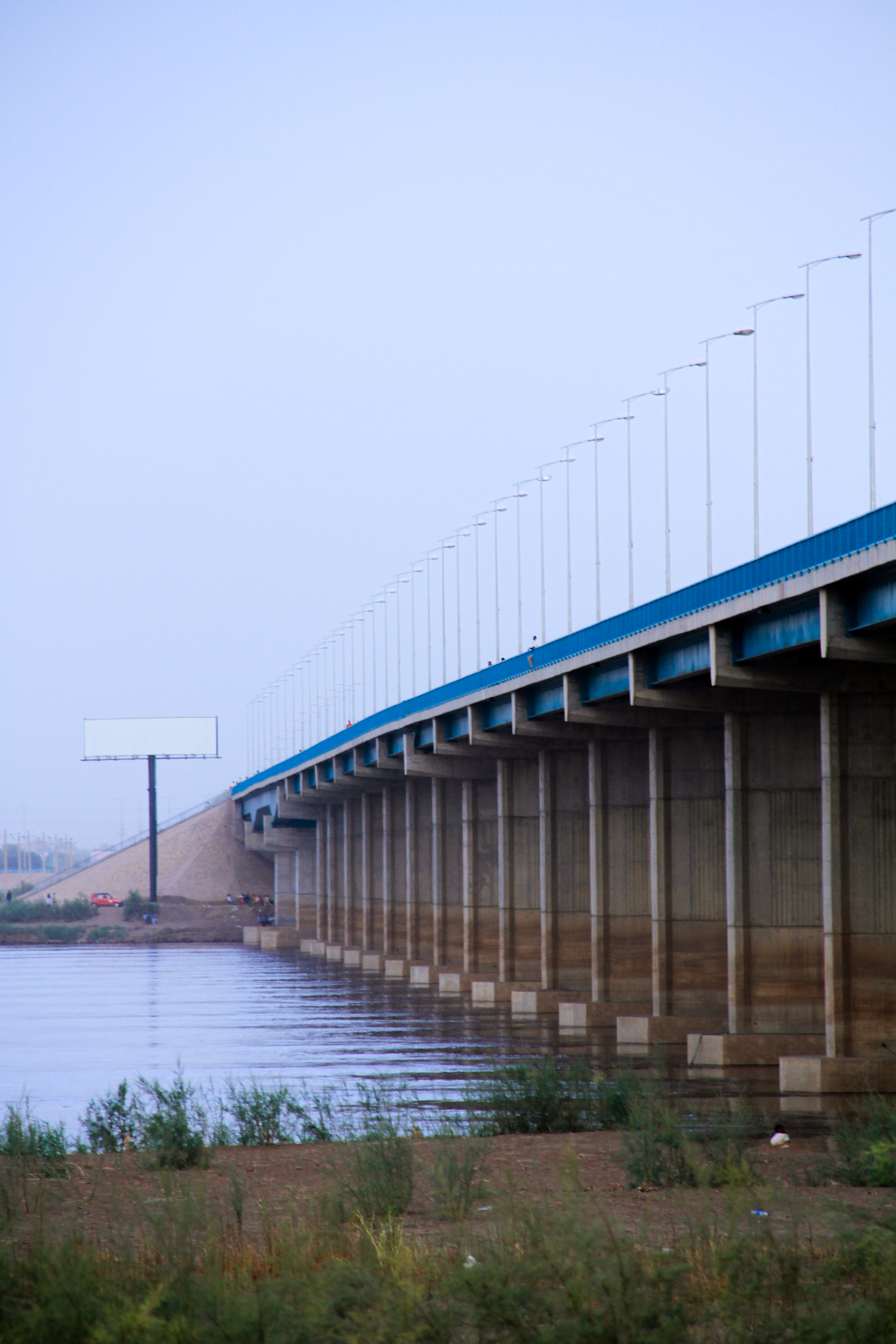
Al Halfaya Bridge

=== Bridges ===
The following bridges cross the Blue Nile and connect Khartoum North to Khartoum:

- Mac Nimir Bridge
- Blue Nile Road and Railway Bridge
- Cooper Bridge
- Al Mansheiya Bridge
- Shambat Bridge crosses the Nile and connects the neighborhood to Omdurman, it was destroyed in 2023.

== Education ==
- Mashreq University
- University of Bahri
- Alzaiem Alazhari University
- Al-Salama College of Science and Technology

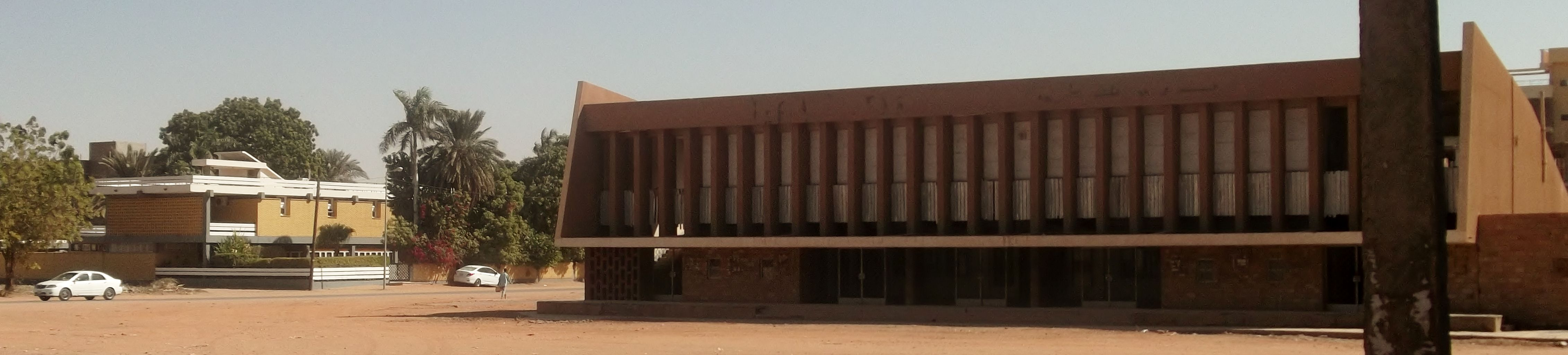
Alsafia Cinema, Khartoum North

== Notable people ==
- Noor al-Jailani
