= Juba =

Capital and largest city of South Sudan

- Capital city
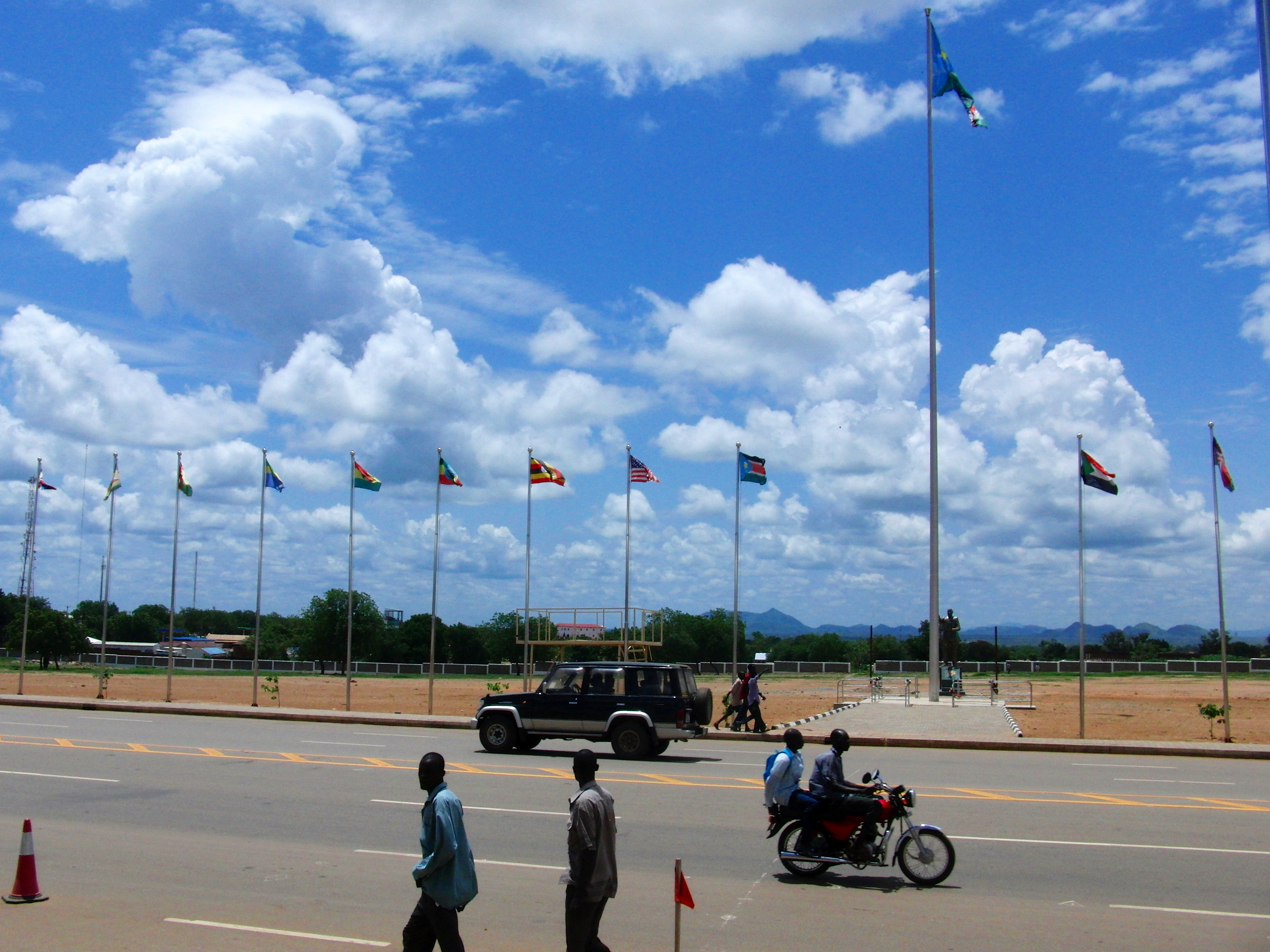
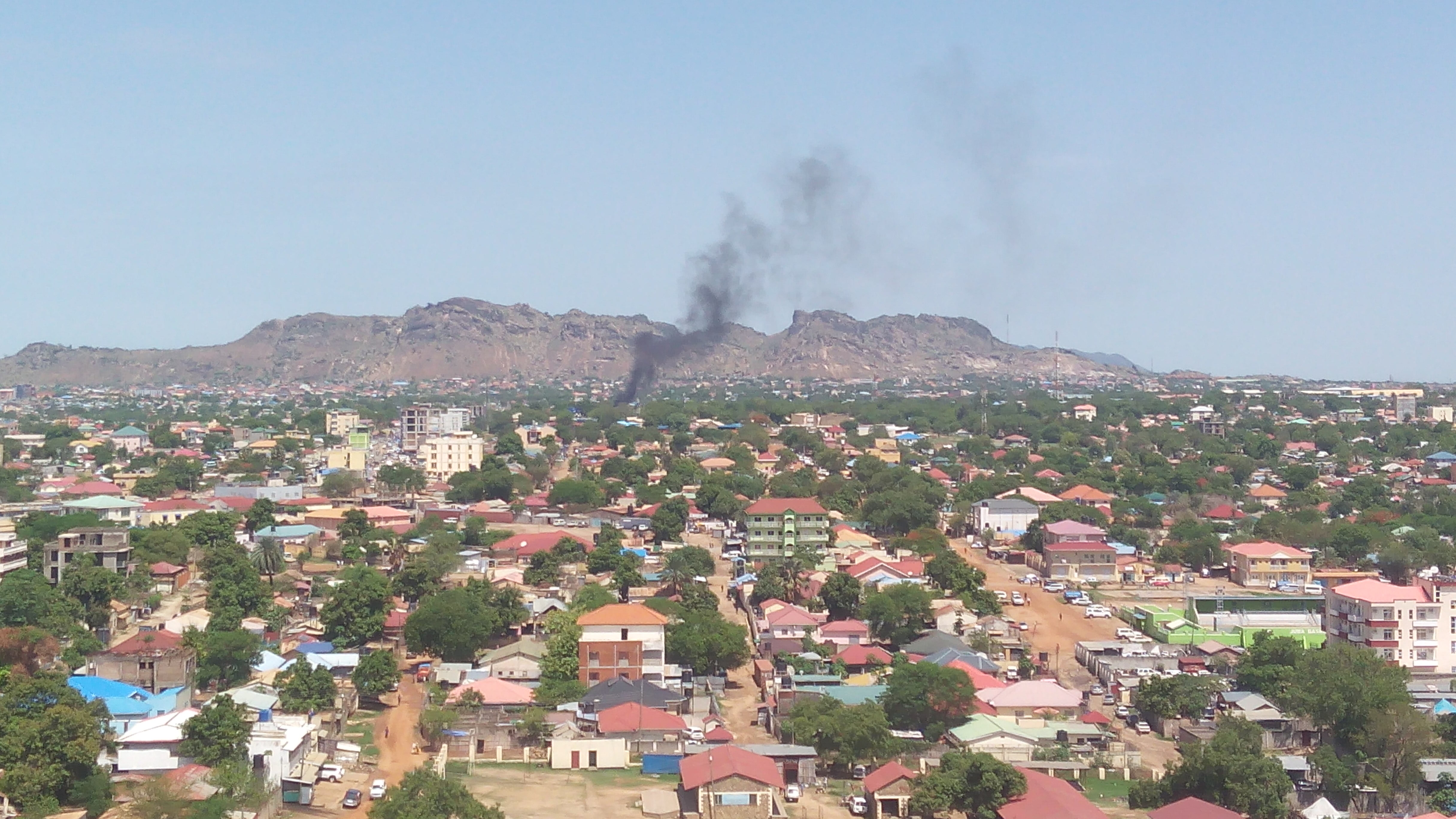
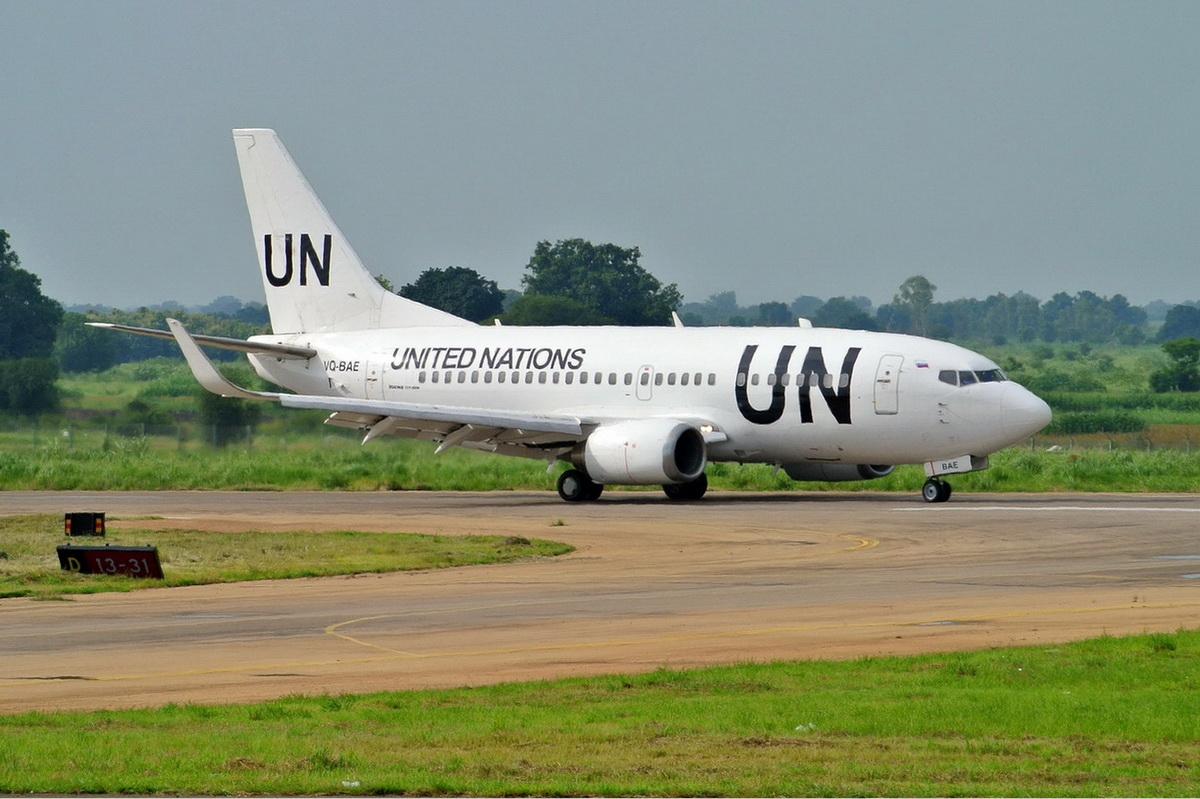
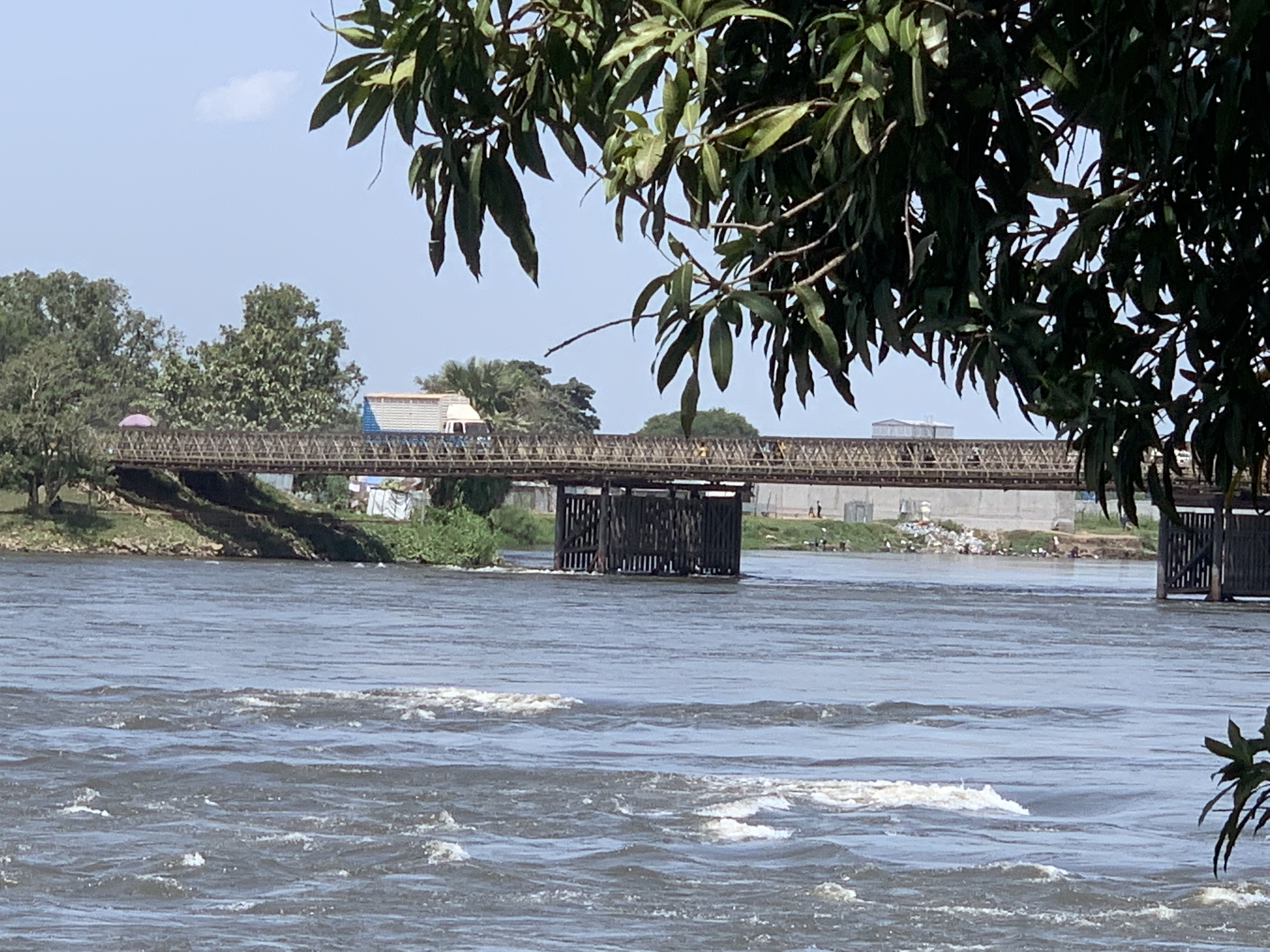
- From top, left to right: View of Juba, John Garang Mausoleum Square, aerial view, United Nations (UTair) Boeing 737, White Nile river in Juba

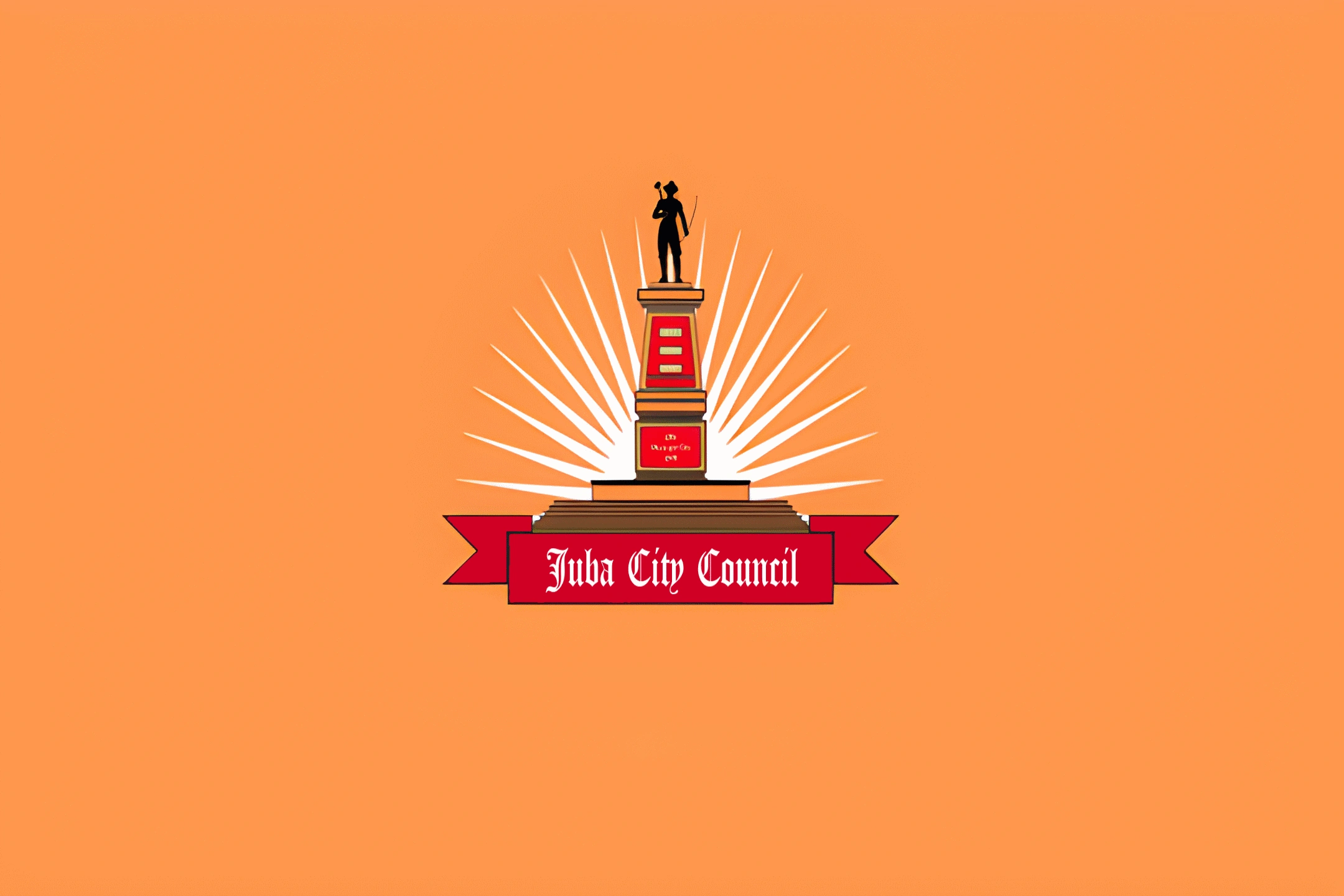
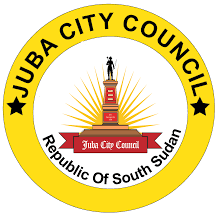
- Flag Seal

- Location of Juba in South Sudan Location in Africa
- Coordinates: 4°51′14″N 31°34′57″E
- Country: South Sudan
- State: Central Equatoria
- County: Juba
- Payam: Juba
- Founded: 1922

Government
  - Type: Mayor-council government
  - Mayor: Flora Gabriel Modi (2023–present)

Area
  - Capital city: 52 km^{2} (20 sq mi)
  - Metro: 336 km^{2} (130 sq mi)
- Elevation: 550 m (1,800 ft)

Population (2017)
  - Capital city: 525,953
  - Estimate (2026): 474,156
  - Rank: 1st in South Sudan
  - Density: 10,000/km^{2} (26,000/sq mi)
  - Urban: 522,000
  - Metro: 710,000
- Time zone: UTC+02:00 (CAT)
- Climate: Aw

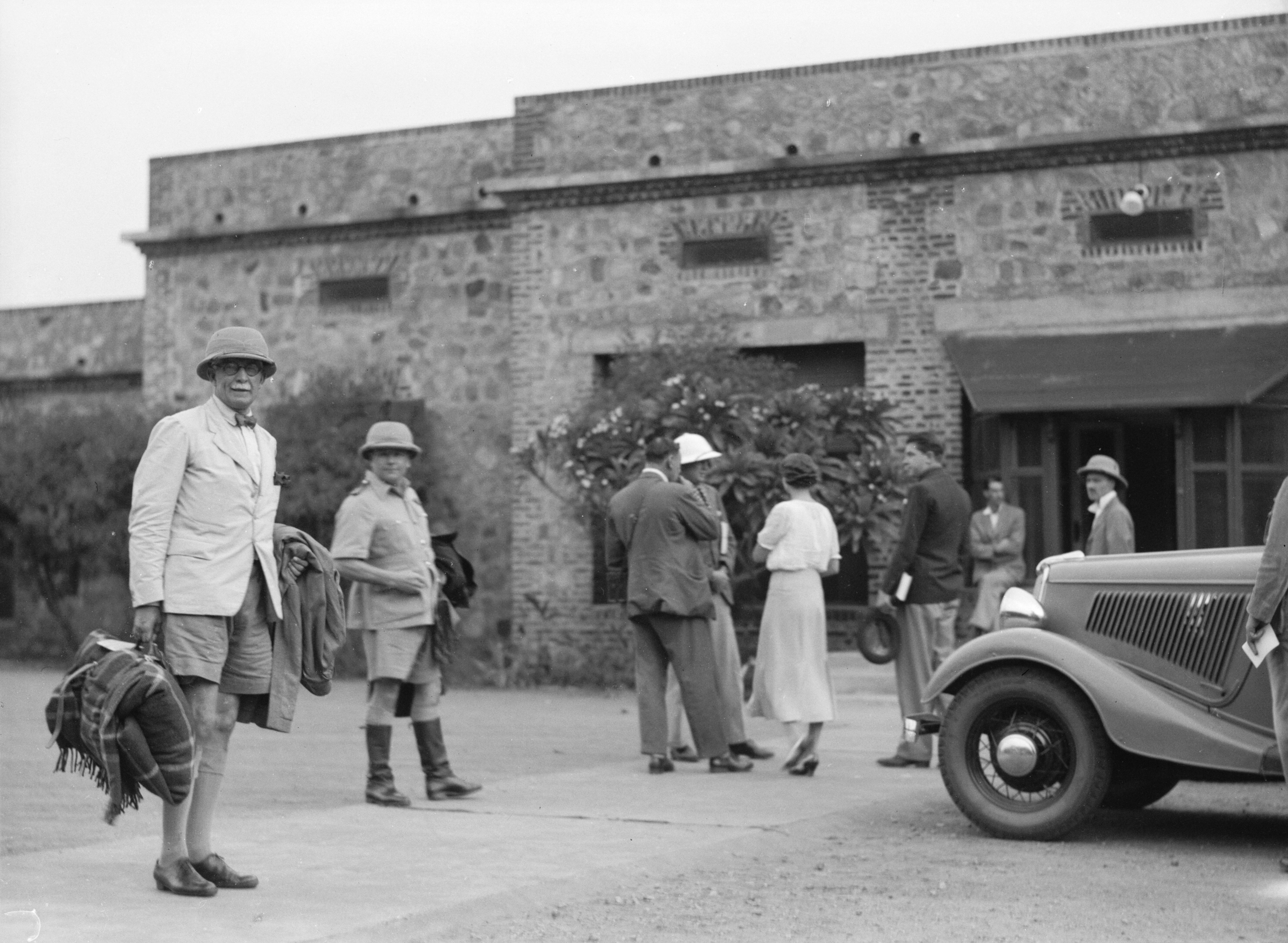
Juba, Anglo-Egyptian Sudan in the 1930s

Juba (Note: /ˈdʒuːbə/) is the capital and largest city of South Sudan. The city is situated on the White Nile and also serves as the capital of the Central Equatoria State. In 2017 it had a population of 525,953. It has an area of 52 km^{2} (20 sq mi), with the metropolitan area covering 336 km^{2} (130 sq mi).

Juba was established in 1920–21 by the Church Missionary Society (CMS) in a small Bari village, also called Juba. The city was made the capital of Mongalla Province in the late 1920s. The growth of the town accelerated following the signing of the Comprehensive Peace Agreement in 2005, which made Juba the capital of the Autonomous Government of Southern Sudan. Juba became the capital of South Sudan in 2011 after its independence, but influential parties wanted Ramciel to be the capital. The government announced the move of the capital to Ramciel, but it has not yet occurred.

== History ==
Under the Khedivate of Egypt, Juba served as the southernmost garrison of the Egyptian Army, quartering only a handful of soldiers. Disease was common; soldiers often fell ill due to the malaria, meningitis and blackwater fever that was prevalent in the region. Explorers and campaigners Samuel Baker and Florence Baker used the nearby island of Gondokoro as a base during their expeditions to what is now South Sudan and northern Uganda from 1863 to 1865 and 1871 to 1873.

The present city of Juba was established on the site of a small Bari village, also called Juba, where the Church Missionary Society (CMS) had established a mission and the Nugent Memorial Intermediate School in 1920–21. In the late 1920s, Anglo-Egyptian officials ordered Bari residents to relocate so that a new town could be constructed to serve as the capital of Mongalla Province. The site was chosen by Anglo-Egyptian officials partly because of the presence of the CMS Nugent Memorial Intermediate School there, and partly because its proximity to river transportation on the Nile. Major construction of the new city of Juba was underway by 1927. Traders from Rejaf relocated to the new city in 1929, and the Governor's office of Mongalla was moved there in 1930.

Greek merchants supplying the British Army played an early and central role in the establishment of Juba in the early 1920s. Their number never exceeded 2,000, but because of their excellent relationship with the native Bari people and the large amount of resulting assistance they received, they built many structures in the downtown Juba Market area as well as in the area that the contemporary British soldiers called the Greek Quarter, which is today the small suburb of Hai Jalaba. Many of these structures are still standing today. Public buildings, such as the Ivory Bank, Notos Lounge, the old Sudan Airways Building, Paradise Hotel, and the Nile Commercial Bank and Buffalo Commercial Bank, were all built by Greeks. Greek merchants were responsible for the construction of the Central Bank building in the mid-1940s, as well as the Juba Hotel in the mid-1930s.

From the establishment of Anglo-Egyptian Sudan in 1899, the British administered southern Sudan separately from the north. In 1946, without consulting Southern opinion, the British administration began instead to implement a policy of uniting the north and the south. To facilitate the new policy, the Juba Conference was convened as a gesture to southerners, the hidden aim being the appeasement of northern Sudanese nationalists and the Egyptian government.

Until 1956, Juba was in Anglo-Egyptian Sudan, which was jointly administered by the United Kingdom and the Kingdom of Egypt. In 1955, a mutiny of southern soldiers in Torit sparked the First Sudanese Civil War, which did not end until 1972. During the Second Sudanese Civil War, Juba was a strategic location that was the focus of much fighting.

In 2005, Juba became the interim seat and the capital of the Autonomous Government of Southern Sudan after the signing of the Comprehensive Peace Agreement (before the agreement, Rumbek had been the proposed interim capital). With the advent of peace, the United Nations increased its presence in Juba, shifting its management of operations in Southern Sudan from its previous location in Kenya. Under the leadership of the United Nations Office for the Coordination of Humanitarian Affairs, the United Nations established a camp known as "OCHA Camp", which served as a base for many United Nations agencies and non-governmental organizations.

From 2006 to 2011, Juba grew at a fast pace, with its population rising from 250,000 to a million. The city became an amalgamation of villages, with many refugees and returnees mimicking their old way of living. In this period, the local Bari ethnic communities kept a distance from newcomers, due to ethno-regional stereotyping. This ethnic tension was crucial for the land distribution in Juba.

Juba became South Sudan's national capital on 9 July 2011, when South Sudan formally declared its independence from the Republic of the Sudan. However, influential parties including the South Sudanese government expressed dissatisfaction with the city's suitability as a national capital, and the government proposed that a new planned city be built as a replacement capital elsewhere, most likely Ramciel in Lakes.

On 5 September 2011, the government announced the capital of South Sudan would move some 250 km away from Juba to Ramciel, which is located in the middle of South Sudan, about 60 km East of Yirol West County, Lakes State. As of August 2026, the move has yet to occur.

In December 2013, with the beginning of the South Sudanese Civil War, the clashes between President Salva Kiir and former vice president Riek Machar's forces spread mass violence in the city's suburbs, leaving 300 dead. The clashes began again in July 2016, when Kiir and Machar agreed to share power, bringing the SPLM/A-IO back to the city. In November 2017, the former chief of general staff Paul Malong Awan was removed from the city, and since then has become a fortified stronghold for President Kiir.

In September 2015, nearly 200 people were killed in a tanker explosion in Juba.

Since the beginning of the 2023 Sudan Conflict, approximately 6,000 refugees have arrived in the city. Many settled in Gorom, an area near the city, and have struggled from lack of humanitarian aid.

== Government ==
Juba is led by a city council, formed in March 2011. The council was established by Governor Clement Wani Konga, who appointed Mohammed El Haj Baballa as mayor of the council and former Yei County Commissioner David Lokonga Moses was appointed as deputy mayor. A ministerial committee to keep Juba clean and sanitary was also created by gubernatorial decree at the same time.

Juba concentrated many of the public services from South Sudan, but they were already under stress since its independence. There were also "neighborhood authorities", citizens who manage a small part of the town appointed by the ethnic groups. By the end of 2017, many of those offices were defunct, and the informal system of governance strengthened. Another important governmental force is the many armed groups scattered through the city.

In Michael Lado Allah-Jabu was appointed mayor of the city council following the removal of Kalisto Lado by Governor of Central Equatoria Emmanuel Adil Anthony. Allah-Jabu was himself removed by Adil Anthony on 27 June 2023. Following his removal, Emmanuel Khamis was appointed caretaker mayor.

Prior to March 2011, the area now administered by Juba City Council was divided into Juba, Kator, and Muniki payams. It is now a standalone subdivision of Juba County, of which it is the county seat.

== Transportation ==
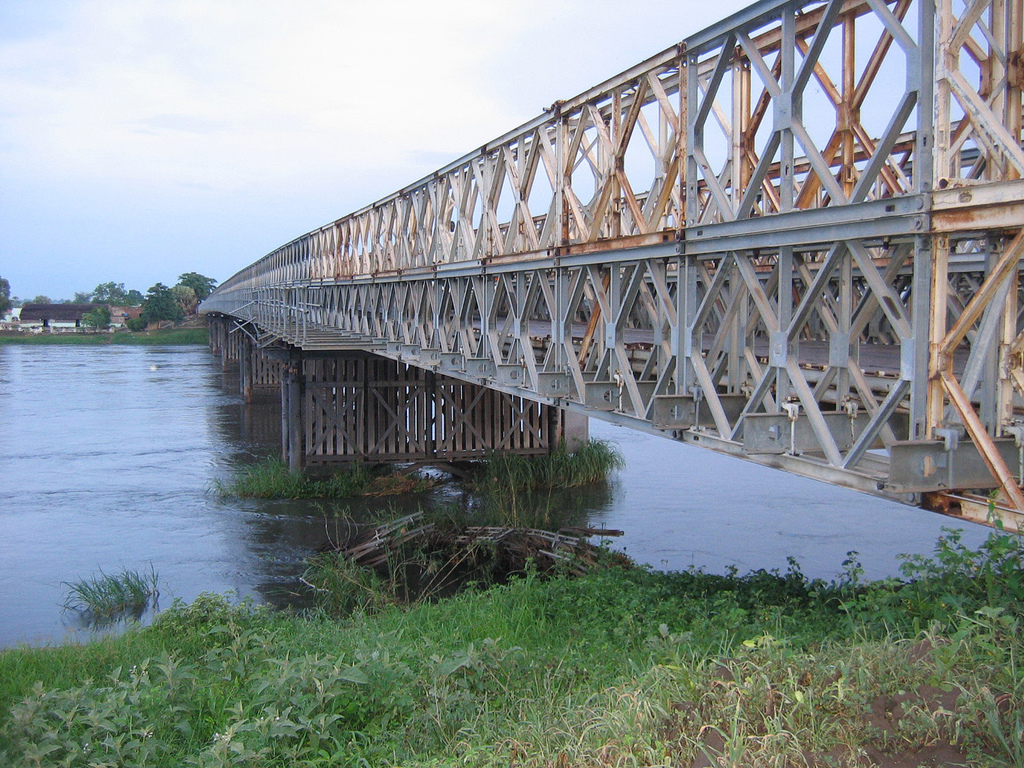
Juba Bridge, a prefabricated Bailey bridge over the White Nile

The city is a river port and the southern terminus of traffic along the Nile (specifically along the Bahr-al-Ghazal portion of the White Nile). Before the civil war, Juba was also a transport hub, with highways connecting it to Kenya, Uganda and the Democratic Republic of the Congo.

Since the end of the war, Juba has been unable to recover to its pre-war state and is no longer a significant trade city. Roads and the river harbour are no longer in use due to being in disrepair. The United Nations and the South Sudanese government are working on repairing the roads, but a full repair is expected to take many years. In 2003, the Swiss Foundation for Mine Action (FSD) started to clear the roads leading from Juba to Uganda and Kenya. It was expected that these roads would be completely de-mined and rebuilt from 2006 to 2008. The rebuilding of the roads, which are mostly unpaved, takes a tremendous amount of effort and time because of the limited work season due to the lengthy rainy season, which lasts from March until October. The roads are important for the peace process in Sudan as people need them to return to their homes and to regain what they feel is a normal life. The first road that has started to be rebuilt is the road to Uganda. This road is particularly important, as many of the original inhabitants of Juba fled to Uganda during the war. As of 2009, there are three paved roads in Juba, one that was re-surfaced in July. The main one is a concrete road, built by the British in the 1950s.

Between 2008 and 2011, the Ugandan government and the Southern Sudanese government undertook joint efforts to develop a railway link between the Northern Ugandan city of Gulu and Juba, with an extension to Wau. A memorandum of understanding between the two governments was signed to that effect in August 2008. The same memorandum outlined plans to develop the road network between the two countries. Recent media reports from the region suggest that the railway link from Juba may link directly with Kenya, bypassing Uganda. Juba International Airport (IATA: JUB, ICAO: HJJJ) is the site of large numbers of flights bringing UN and non-governmental organization (NGO) aid into South Sudan, as well as passengers and general air freight. The construction of a new terminal began in late 2007 when the oil prices were very high ($100+). Since then, with the oil prices going back down, the fate of the new terminal is uncertain. Building on the new terminal restarted in early 2014. As of November 2025, there are daily flights to Addis Ababa Bole International Airport in Addis Ababa, Ethiopia, Jomo Kenyatta International Airport in Nairobi, Kenya, Entebbe International Airport in Entebbe, Uganda, and Wau Airport in Wau, South Sudan. The United Nations Mission in South Sudan has a large compound near the Juba Airport.

== Demographics ==
In 2005, Juba's population was 163,442. Based on an analysis of aerial photos, the best estimate of several donors working in Juba calculated the 2006 population at approximately 250,000. The 5th Sudan Population and Housing Census took place in April/May 2008, stating the population of Juba County to be 372,413 (the majority residing in Juba City, which dominates the county), but the results were rejected by the Autonomous Government of Southern Sudan. In 2011, the population of the city of Juba was estimated at 372,410, but may potentially be higher. As of 2013, the city's population was growing at a rate of 4.23%. The Juba City Council's CEO, Martin Simon Wani, has claimed the population exceeds one million with up to a million more living in surrounding suburbs. Suburbs adjacent to Juba have become increasingly dense as people from the countryside move into the city for economic opportunities.

| Year | Population | Ref. |
|---|---|---|
| 1973 (census) | 56,740 | |
| 1983 (census) | 83,790 | |
| 1993 (census) | 114,980 | |
| 2005 (estimate) | 163,440 | |
| 2006 (estimate) | 250,000 | |
| 2008 (estimate) | 250,000 | |
| 2011 (estimate) | 372,410 | |
| 2014 (estimate) | 492,970 | |

== Economy ==
Following South Sudan's independence in 2011, Juba experienced rapid economic growth and urban development. The prospect of an economic boom has brought thousands of merchants to Juba, from northern Sudan and East Africa. As of October 2010, several regional and international businesses have established a presence in Juba. The Commercial Bank of Ethiopia and the Kenyan banking conglomerate Kenya Commercial Bank has its South Sudanese headquarters in the city and a branch network of eleven branches throughout South Sudan. The three indigenous South Sudanese commercial banks namely; Buffalo Commercial Bank, Ivory Bank and Nile Commercial Bank, all maintain their headquarters in Juba. Equity Bank, another regional finance services provider also has a branch in Juba. National Insurance Corporation (NIC), the leading Ugandan insurance services provider, maintains an office in the city. Despite recent economic difficulties brought about by the 15 December 2013 civil war, Juba has continued to grow and construction is still booming. This is probably due to the high demand for affordable housing and hotel accommodations. Research from the Overseas Development Institute found that markets in Juba are transient, as many traders come only to make a quick profit and therefore do not invest in storage facilities or shops. Since 2005, Chinese involvement in Juba has expanded through healthcare assistance, including medical teams stationed at the Juba Teaching Hospital.

== Roads ==
Juba has major roads that go to major towns in South Sudan, such roads include the Juba-Nimule road and the Aggrey Jaden Road. as others are seen in the table below;

| Number | Name of road | Distance | Designated | Completed |
|---|---|---|---|---|
| 1 | Juba–Nimule Road | 192 km (119 mi) | 2007 | 2012 |
| 2 | Gulu–Nimule Road | 105 km (65 mi) | 2012 | 2015 |
| TBA | Kangi-Bar-Urud Road | 28 km (17 mi) | 2017? | 2017 (Expected) |
| TBA | Aggrey Jaden Road (Juba-Yei- Kaya Road) | 243 km (151 mi) | 2022 | 2025 (Expected) |
| TBA | Juba-Torit-Nadapal Highway | 353 kilometers (219miles) | ? | ? |
| TBA | Juba-Bor-Malakal Highway | 500 km (311 mi) | 2020 | 2025 (Expected) |
| TBA | Juba–Terekeka–Rumbek Road | 392 km (244 mi) | 2019 | 2025 (Expected) |
| TBA | Kajo- keji - Juba Road | 156 kilometers (97miles) | | |

== Food ==
A variety of foods are eaten in Juba including:

- Kisra: A staple food in South Sudan, kisra is a type of flatbread made from sorghum flour or maize flour. It is typically served with soup or stew and is prepared by mixing sorghum flour with water to form a thick batter, which is then left to ferment for a few days before being cooked on a hot griddle.
- Bamia: A popular dish in Juba, bamia is a stew made with okra, tomatoes, onions, and meat (usually beef or goat). The okra is sliced and cooked with the other ingredients until tender, resulting in a thick and flavorful stew that is often served with rice or kisra.
- Ful Medames: A traditional breakfast dish in Juba, Ful medames is made from cooked fava beans that are smashed and seasoned with garlic, lemon juice, and olive oil. It is typically served with flatbread or pita.
- Asida: A type of porridge made from sorghum flour, Asida is a popular dish in Juba that is often served with meat or vegetable stew. The sorghum flour is mixed with water to form a thick paste, which is then cooked until it reaches a smooth and creamy consistency.
- Malakwang: A traditional dish in South Sudan, Malakwang is a stew made from leafy greens, peanuts, butter, and meat (usually goat or beef). The greens are cooked with the other ingredients until tender, resulting in a rich and flavorful stew that is often served with rice or Ugali.
- Ugali: A staple food in many African countries, Ugali is a type of maize porridge that is often served with stews or soups. The maize flour is mixed with water to form a thick paste, which is often cooked until it reaches a smooth and firm consistency. It is typically eaten by hand, using it to scoop up stew or soup.

== Education ==
- The University of Juba was founded in 1975.
- Upper Nile University in Juba
- The Juba Public Peace Library was founded on 1 October 2019. The library was donated by The South Sudan Library Foundation and contains over 13,000 books. It was the first public library of South Sudan. The South Sudan Library Foundation was co-founded by Yawusa Kintha and Kevin Lenahan.
- Kampala International University
- Catholic University of South Sudan
- Episcopal University of South Sudan
- Starford International University
- Ayii University

== Health services ==
- Juba Teaching Hospital
- Juba Military Referral Hospital
- Al Sabah Children's Hospital
- Nyakurun PHCC
- Munuki PHCC
- Gurei PHCC

== Places of worship ==
Places of worship in Juba primarily consists of Christian churches and temples: Roman Catholic Archdiocese of Juba (Catholic Church), Province of the Episcopal Church of South Sudan (Anglican Communion), Baptist Convention of South Sudan (Baptist World Alliance), Presbyterian Church in Sudan (World Communion of Reformed Churches).

== Climate ==
Juba has a tropical wet and dry climate (Köppen: Aw), and as it lies near the equator, temperatures are hot year-round. However, little rain falls from November to March, which is also the time of the year with the hottest maximum temperatures, reaching 37.8 °C (100 °F) in February. From April to October, more than 100 millimetres or 4 inches of rain falls per month. The annual total precipitation is nearly 1,000 millimetres or 40 inches.

Climate data for Juba (1991–2020, extremes 1931–present)
| Month | Jan | Feb | Mar | Apr | May | Jun | Jul | Aug | Sep | Oct | Nov | Dec | Year |
|---|---|---|---|---|---|---|---|---|---|---|---|---|---|
| Record high °C (°F) | 42.2 (108.0) | 43.0 (109.4) | 43.6 (110.5) | 42.4 (108.3) | 43.7 (110.7) | 38.5 (101.3) | 37.0 (98.6) | 38.5 (101.3) | 39.0 (102.2) | 39.6 (103.3) | 40.4 (104.7) | 42.8 (109.0) | 43.7 (110.7) |
| Mean daily maximum °C (°F) | 37.8 (100.0) | 38.9 (102.0) | 38.9 (102.0) | 36.1 (97.0) | 33.9 (93.0) | 32.2 (90.0) | 31.1 (88.0) | 31.1 (88.0) | 32.8 (91.0) | 33.9 (93.0) | 35.6 (96.1) | 36.7 (98.1) | 34.7 (94.5) |
| Daily mean °C (°F) | 29.8 (85.6) | 30.9 (87.6) | 32.3 (90.1) | 29.7 (85.5) | 28.1 (82.6) | 27.0 (80.6) | 26.1 (79.0) | 26.1 (79.0) | 27.0 (80.6) | 27.8 (82.0) | 28.7 (83.7) | 28.9 (84.0) | 28.5 (83.4) |
| Mean daily minimum °C (°F) | 21.7 (71.1) | 22.8 (73.0) | 25.6 (78.1) | 23.3 (73.9) | 22.2 (72.0) | 21.7 (71.1) | 21.1 (70.0) | 21.1 (70.0) | 21.1 (70.0) | 21.7 (71.1) | 21.7 (71.1) | 21.1 (70.0) | 22.0 (71.6) |
| Record low °C (°F) | 11.4 (52.5) | 12.2 (54.0) | 16.3 (61.3) | 16.5 (61.7) | 16.8 (62.2) | 14.0 (57.2) | 13.3 (55.9) | 16.0 (60.8) | 15.5 (59.9) | 14.0 (57.2) | 13.2 (55.8) | 13.9 (57.0) | 11.4 (52.5) |
| Average rainfall mm (inches) | 4.3 (0.17) | 11.0 (0.43) | 36.1 (1.42) | 111.3 (4.38) | 129.0 (5.08) | 117.1 (4.61) | 143.0 (5.63) | 148.1 (5.83) | 116.1 (4.57) | 180.3 (7.10) | 71.1 (2.80) | 8.1 (0.32) | 1,145.4 (45.09) |
| Average rainy days (≥ 1 mm) | 0 | 1 | 3 | 8 | 10 | 13 | 15 | 15 | 13 | 11 | 5 | 0 | 94 |
| Average relative humidity (%) | 44 | 42 | 51 | 64 | 73 | 76 | 81 | 80 | 77 | 73 | 69 | 53 | 65 |
| Mean monthly sunshine hours | 279.0 | 235.2 | 210.8 | 198.0 | 207.7 | 207.0 | 182.9 | 204.6 | 228.0 | 241.8 | 237.0 | 260.4 | 2,692.4 |
| Percentage possible sunshine | 76 | 67 | 57 | 54 | 62 | 58 | 50 | 57 | 63 | 64 | 68 | 68 | 62 |
Source 1: World Meteorological Organization,
Source 2: NOAA (sun and humidity, 1961–1990), Deutscher Wetterdienst (extremes, mean temperatures)

== Notable people ==
- Aheu Deng, beauty queen and fashion model
- Bangs, rapper and YouTube personality
- Mangok Mathiang (born 1992), Australian-Sudanese basketball player for the Beijing Ducks of the Chinese Basketball Association
- Emmanuel Jambo, photographer
- Independent Moses Nunuh, first child born in South Sudan after its independence. Like many other children in South Sudan, he died before his first birthday.

== See also ==
- Equatoria
  - Eastern Equatoria
  - Central Equatoria
  - Western Equatoria
- Gulu-Nimule Road
- Juba Stadium
- Lainya County
- Railway stations in South Sudan
- Anataban Campaign
