= Colonial aviation in Africa =

Colonial aviation in Africa began with first two flights in Africa, 18 November 1909 in Algeria, northern Africa and 18 December that year in South Africa. Afterwards, British and French aerial expeditions soon followed, aimed at surveying and establishing overland routes.

== History ==
=== First two flights ===
René Métrot and Jean Marcé, both Algerian motorists and garage owners, became fascinated with aviation after seeing the new flying machine demonstrations at Mourmelon in Metropolitan France. Afterwards, they ordered two Voisin aircraft, and Métrot went to Camp de Châlons to learn to fly. His Voisin, fitted with an E.N.V. engine, arrived in Algeria on 10 November 1909. With permission from the Société hippique and the army, Métrot and Marcé constructed a hangar at the hippodrome du Caroubier (Caroubier racecourse). On 18 November 1909 at 17:30, Métrot, took off from the racecourse, climbing about 70 metres and covering approximately one kilometre at an altitude of 25 metres. This event marked the first powered flight in Algeria, and in Africa. The aircraft was slightly damaging on landing, however it was repaired in time for a planned public aviation event. A public aviation meeting was to happen on 21 November, however it was postponed until 28 November 1909. The event attracted a large crowd of up to 50,000 spectators, and special railway services were arranged to bring people to Caroubier. In front of the grandstands, a 350-metre track was prepared. Métrot and Marcé would soon follow-up with further demonstrations at Blida-Joinville on 19 December that year.

The initial opportunity for an aviation demonstration tour in South Africa began in East London in early 1909. The Gala Subcommittee of the East London Town Council advertised for an aviator to demonstrate a flying machine during the town's forthcoming gala season. Local engineering firm Howard, Farrar and Robinson & Co. soon responded by arranging to import a modern powered aircraft and an aviator from France. Albert Kimmerling was contacted and accompanied by Voisin mechanic J. Moller, leaving France on 27 November that year. The Voisin aircraft was dismantled and packed in three large crates aboard the RMS Kenilworth Castle. On 18 December 1909, the aircraft arrived at East London, where it was assembled. The aircraft was a Voisin pusher biplane with a 50-hp Gnome rotary engine, which could only fly about 30 miles per hour. It was then transported to the Nahoon Racecourse, and Kimmerling performed his flight on 28 December.

=== Emerging interest ===
"The interest in aviation as a prospective means of transportation over the wide distances of Africa was naturally an early one."

— The Airpost Journal, Number 7 of Volume 32, April 1961

On 3 October 1910, General Maurice Bailloud, commander of the French XIX Army Corps, called on the formation of a Desert Air Corps in Algeria, prospecting Saharan aviation. Subsequently, the French government authorised a six-aircraft expedition to Algeria, with Biskra chosen as its experimental base. Investigations were undertaken throughout 1911 by French military officers, and Lieutenant Max de Lafargue, of the 2rd Spahis, was sent to Metropolitan France for training. Before leaving Algeria, Lafargue presented to the Société de géographie de l'Algérie et de l'Afrique du Nord (Geographical Society of Algeria and North Africa) the planned aerial network developed with Bailloud. The network was to be expanded progressively, beginning with a route linking Biskra, Touggourt, Colomb-Béchar, and Béni-Abbès, before extending farther into the Sahara. On 17 February 1912, French Army aviators Lafargue and Jean Reimbert made the first flight over the Sahara from their base in Biskra. On 22 March 1912, the two departed to continue the planned Biskra-Touggourt-Ouargla route. Along the way, they encountered severe sandstorms and had to land several times. Touggourt was finally reached two days later, and from Touggourt, they conducted further reconnaissance flights on 24-26 March toward Temcine, Bled-el-Ahmad, and Aïn-Ahnefiane. Lafargue and Reimbert returned to Biskra on 27 March.

De Volkstem Building was established in 1873 and is currently a national monument, located on the corner of Pretorius Street and Volkstem Lane.

In March 1911, during a meeting held at the De Volkstem Building in Pretoria, a motion was passed to form the Aeronautical Society of South Africa. The motion was moved by Dr. F. V. Engelenburg, followed by W. Burningham White, and Johann Rissik nominated as its inaugural president. It had the stated purpose of giving a stronger impulse to the scientific study of aerial navigation. Additionally, John Weston had returned from Europe, and with his aviation experience, played a leading role in founding the Society. After returning to South Africa from Britain's September 1911 aerial mail, E. F. "Bok" Driver joined up with Captain Guy Livingstone and Cecil Compton-Paterson to established the African Aviation Syndicate. In December 1911, the African Aviation Syndicate's aircraft arrived at Cape Town, and they began hosting major public activities in the city. This included the first major public display which was the Flying Fortnight held at Kenilworth Racecourse. The syndicate was equipped with two aircraft, and began setting a number of highly successfully flights. In South Africa, Driver would set an altitude record of 4,000 feet, and Day Paterson set a distance record of 30 miles on Christmas Day. These activities began spreading aviation interests across South Africa and Rhodesia.

=== Expeditions ===
Short S.80 beached for engine repairs during Frank K. McClean's 1914 Nile expedition.

Nile expeditions

In 1913, British aviator Francis McClean and Scottish explorer John Herbert Spottiswoode decided to attempt an aerial journey from Alexandria to Khartoum, following the Nile. The expedition was aimed at investigating the practical use of aircraft along the Nile and, particularly, to examine the cataracts between Aswan and Khartoum. To prepare for the journey, McClean extensively modified his Short biplane. It was given a 70 ft 6 in wingspan, resulting in a low wing loading. However, the aircraft proved too slow and underpowered, and McClean approached the Short Brothers to develop an experimental aircraft. Afterwards, they developed the Short S.80 Nile Seaplane, which was equipped with a 160 hp Gnome Double Lambda rotary engine, two large floats, a spacious nacelle with seating for the expedition party, and an approximately 67 ft wingspan. It was first flown as a seaplane on 2 October 1913 by Gordon Bell at Leysdown.

The S.80 was loaded onto British steamship Corsican Prince and arrived at Alexandra on 27 December. After arriving, McClean reassembled the aircraft at the Naval Dockyard, assisted by Alec Ogilvie, Horace Short, their mechanic Gus Smith, and Anna McClean whom was in charge of the party's domestic affairs. On 3 January 1914, the group of four took off and flew 160 miles to Cairo in under three hours. The S.80 could not reach beyond Cairo, and Spottiswoode later stashed fuel dumps close to the railway in 120-mile intervals along the route. After a few days, the party re-attempted the flight from Aswan Dam, however the S.80 was performing badly and McClean returned after 40 miles. Four new cylinders were cabled from Paris, and a fresh start was made on 16 February. The party flew approximately 190 miles southwards, reaching Wadi Halfa where they encountered the cataracts of the Nile. Passing by Argo, a dust storm forced a sudden landing and the S.80 suffered damage to a wingtip and spar. At one point, an oil pump failed and McClean landed the S.80 on the rocky riverbeds of the Nile, taxiing the aircraft several miles to Shereik. The Sudan Railway was crucial to the expedition, providing spare parts to replace oil pumps and parts of the wing. On 22 March, following multiple stopovers, issues, and part replacements, the party successfully reached Khartoum. By then, much of the aircraft was modified from replacements.

However, French aviator Marc Pourpe and his mechanic Raoul Lufbery had already reached Khartoum when McClean arrived. Equipped with a Morane-Saulnier Type C, fitted with a 60 hp Gnome engine, they attempted to depart on 11 December 1913 although it failed. On 4 January 1914, a second attempt was made and Pourpe departed from the Heliopolis Aerodrome at 9:07 AM, with his intended first stop as Luxor. After flying 467 kilometres, Pourpe was forced to land at Menshah, about 20 km short of Luxor due to technical problems. Lufbery travelled by train to Luxor to retrieve spare parts and returned to the location to make repairs. Afterwards, Pourpe continued southwards through Aswan, Wadi Halfa, Abu Hamed, Atbara, and finally reaching Khartoum on 12 January 1914. The journey was completed in five stages, approximately covering 2,200 kilometres and about 16 hours of flying time. Pourpe's aeroplane was the first to land in Khartoum, ahead by two months from McClean's expedition.

1919 Mission Saoura-Tidikelt

In late 1918, General Robert Nivelle, now commanding the French forces in Algeria and Tunisia, wanted to test whether Sahara could be explored with joint-expeditions involving motor vehicles working with aircraft. Beginning on 21 January 1919, an expedition was assembled in Colomb-Béchar equipped with four Farman aircraft, and multiple tractors. In the night of 23-24 January 1919, the convoy left Colomb-Béchar and headed southward off-road for Beni-Abbès via Taghit and Igli. The vehicles soon encountered the Oued Guir near Abadla, which was a 200 metre wide river with steep eroded banks. Eight tractors were pulled across with ropes one-by-one. Worked by a 20-man team, it took two hours to pull just one tractor.

After crossing the Guir, the ground became easier and the convoy reached Beni-Abbès, while the aircraft flew ahead to perform reconnaissance. In the meanwhile, the automobile convoy prepared temporary landing grounds with shovels and picks, marking it for aircraft to land there. Late in the expedition, Captain Daudy, who commanded the four aircraft, made a forced landing near Ksani. He suffered a broken clavicle, and he survived for 48 hours alone before the ground expedition was able to reach him. Reaching Adrar, the expedition split over where to go next. Commandant Henri Bettembourg (1882–1926) suggested to continue south from Reggan towards Niger via Taoudenni, whereas Commandant Max de La Fargue suggested to turn southeast and head towards Niger via In Salah, Ouallen, Hoggar, and Tamanrasset. The expedition chose to continue toward Reggan, passing the monument to explorer Camille Douls, who had been killed by Taureg in 1889. At the end of February, the furthest point was reached at Reggan, where they returned north via In Salah, Ouargls, Touggourt, and Algiers.

=== Expansion ===
The Cairo to Cape Town Aerial Route 1920

In December 1918, the British Air Ministry sought to develop an aerial route between Cairo and Cape Town. Subsequently, three Royal Air Force survey and construction parties were dispatched into Africa, instructed to survey their sectors and cooperate with local colonial administrations. Landing grounds would be constructed at intervals of roughly 200 miles or less. The No. 1 African Survey Party covered Cairo to Nimule, No. 2 African Survey Party covered Nimule to Abercorn, and the No. 3 African Survey Party, commanded by Major Chaplin Court Treatt, covered Abercone to Cape Town via Broken Hill. Work began in January 1919, guided by RAF Commanding Officer Major General Salmond. In many places, aerodromes would have to be cut out of dense jungle, and involved felling thousands of trees and digging up their roots. Additionally, the soil of anthills had to be removed by hand and carried away in native baskets. In each stop, a large cleared and levelled patch of ground would be prepared, accompanied with a stock of fuel. Many of the fields would have a landing ground of 750 x 750 metres. The resulting route comprised a north-south network of 24 airfields and 19 emergency landing grounds. Some were formed in grasslands, some as a tropical jungle strip, and some were established in existing outposts in the deserts.

"Many of these anthills were 25 feet in height and anything up to 45 feet in diameter, and as one cubic yard of anthill weighs about 2 670lb (1 211kg), some idea may be gathered of the amount of work involved, in view of the lack of mechanical equipment. At Ndola, for instance, 700 Africans worked from April to August 1919, moving 25 000 tons of soil and filling in a gully 600 yards in width. Blasting was tried but was found to be ineffective."

— Air Services Newsletter, 2 January 1920

On 1 September 1919, Lignes Aériennes Latécoère began a regular airline service between Rabat in Morocco and Toulouse in France via Barcelona, Alicante, Mälage, and Tangier. This became the first regular aerial route between Europe and Africa. In March, the route was extended to Casablanca.

The "Silver Queen II"—the first aircraft to land in Rhodesia—at Bulawayo racecourse during March 1920.

At the end of December 1919, the Air Ministry declared the Cairo-Cape Town route open, and several expeditions intending to complete the trans-Saharan journey began. By late 1919, there were already proposals for aerial services in Rhodesia, and the British Government had encouraged the British South Africa Company (BSAC) to undertake aerodrome construction. On 26 January 1920, the Johannesburg aviation conference was held, hosting representatives from Southern and Northern Rhodesia, South Africa, the British Army, Royal Mail, and British engineering services. G. H. Eyre, Postmaster General of Southern Rhodesia, was concerned about private monopolies during the conference. If a private company obtained an exclusive concession, the government could lose revenue associated with the carriage of mail. Sir William Hoy, General Manager of the South African Railways and Harbours, counter-argued that while colonial governments posed limited resources and administrative capacity, private enterprise could provide the capital experience necessary to get manage aviation. Following the conference, a public-private model was adopted where private companies would provide services and investment, while government retained regulatory oversight. Subsequently, on 10 March 1920, BSAC entered an agreement with Aircraft Travel Ltd. to provide aircraft, pilots, and logistical support.

1920 trans-African crossings

In 1920, two South African military aviators Lieutenant Colonel Pierre van Ryneveld and Major Christopher Joseph Quintin Brand aimed to fly the Cairo-Cape Town air route. They departed from Brooklands, England on 4 February 1920 in the Vickers Vimy "Silver Queen", crossing the Mediterranean and reached Derna in Libya. They then continued towards Egypt and Sudan, however their first Vimy was forced to land in the Wadi Halfa area due to issues from the engine's radiator. In Egypt, they obtained a second Vickers Vimy, named the "Silver Queen II". On 28 February 1920, they arrived at Abercorn in Rhodesia, becoming the first aeroplane to land in the colony. Flying via Ndola, Broken Hill, and Livingstone, they landed at the Bulawayo racecourse on 5 March. On 6 March, it was wrecked at Bulawayo in Southern Rhodesia, and a de Havilland DH.9 named "Voortrekker" was then sent north from South Africa. On 17 March, Van Ryneveld and Brand resumed the journey on their new aircraft southward from Bulawayo. They successfully completed the first trans-African crossing after landing at Youngsfield, Wynberg in Capetown at 4:00 PM, 20 March. The total journey spanned 45 days, with a flying time of 109 hours and 30 minutes. By changing aircraft, they were disqualified from the £10,000 prize they hoped to win.

The first aeroplane landing in Salisbury by Thompson and Rutherford, at the Salisbury racecourse in Southern Rhodesia, taken on 11 June 1920.

Van Ryneveld and Brandh were not alone in the trans-African mission, having major competitors alongside them. A Times-sponsored Vickers Vimy flown by Captain Stanley Cockerell and Captain Frank Broome, with zoologist Dr. P. Chalmers Mitchell aboard left England in January 1920. They had reached considerably farther than most other attempts, and Dr Chalmer Mitchell's Vimy arrived at Tabora on 26 February. On the morning of 27 February, the Vimy's engine failed during take-off, and ran into the surrounding vegetation damaging it beyond repair. The party aboard was not seriously injured. Van Ryneveld and Brand were also flying nearby during their attempt, however they passed west of Tabora due to a navigation error. As a result, they did not notice the wreckage where the Times party could be assisted.

1925 & 1927 Cobham aerial surveys

On 16 November 1925, English aviator and pioneer Alan Cobham departed Stag Lane Aerodrome, London, in a de Havilland DH.50J (registered G-EBFO) with an Armstrong Siddeley Jaguar piston engine. Tasked with surveying air routes for Imperial Airways, Cobham was accompanied by mechanic A. B. Elliot and photographer B. W. Emmott. He reached Cape Town on 17 February after an outward journey of more than 8,000 miles, surveying the existing Cairo to Cape Town aerial route. At Bulawayo, Cobham reached an altitude of around 5,000 feet, where intense heat and atmospheric conditions reduced aircraft performance. He had to send photographer Emmott onward by rail and offload the amount of petrol being carried.

In November 1926, the North Sea Aerial and General Transport Ltd (NSAGT) made an agreement with the governments of Kenya, Uganda, and Sudan to develop an experimental air service. The company was required to conduct 12 flights in each direction between Khartoum and Kisumu within twelve months, gathering the information to determine the feasibility of the service. A proposed 1,400 mile route was made, commencing at Khartoum and ending at Kisumu via the White Nile. During the 1926 Imperial Conference discussions, Sir Samuel Haore further added that the service was to follow the White Nile, utilising hydroplanes. In February 1927, Captain T. A. Gladstone was entrusted to the surveying of the route, beginning between Kisumu and Khartoum. At the time, Kisumu was the railhead in Lake Victoria, serving as a transfer point between sea, air and land transport. Following the investigations, the experimental service began shortly afterwards. The first aircraft was damaged after hitting an underwater obstruction, and without spare parts, a RAF de Havilland DH.50J Pelican was lent to the company. By July 1927, five successful trips were made, three outward and two on return using that aircraft. However, the service suffered another accident in November, and further experimental flights was entrusted to Alan Cobham. He was tasked with determining a southward extension of the route beyond Kisumu to connect it with the Cairo to Cape Town aerial route. On 17 October, the Pelican was wrecked at Kisumu after a test flight, bringing the service to an end.

=== Growth ===
Detailed shot of refueling the Fokker-Lake Chad flight 1930-31.

By the 1930s, many aerial routes were often expanded and became scheduled. As a result, there was a demand for larger landing grounds, refuelling, repair, shelter and telephone facilities. In February 1931, Imperial Airways commenced a regular service to Mwanza on Lake Victoria, which was progressively extended southward. A weekly London to Cape Town service also began in January 1932, carrying mail. The weekly service was expanded to include passengers in April that year. It ran along the Cairo to Cape Town aerial route established twelve years earlier.

=== Decolonisation ===
By the late 1930, colonial aviation in Africa had matured, having increasingly regular aerial networks. However, with the outbreak of the Second World War, most existing routes were reorganised for wartime needs. Civil aviation was suspended, and most airfields were either enlarged or superseded for military usage. RAF and Allied construction also provided significant infrastructure that colonial governments themselves would have not been able to afford.

The decolonisation of aviation in postwar Africa begins with the recruitment of African employees into European airlines, especially with the East African Airways Corporation (EAAC). Postwar, EAAC had a workforce of 900 employees in 1953 to over 1,500 by 1960 as it increasingly began training Africans for technical positions rather than depending upon expatriates. Furthermore, with the independence of multiple East African territories, EAAC focused on appointing more as pilots, managers, and general staff. In 1960, EAAC's workforce had an African share of 44%, which climbed to 75% by 1970. In 1961, eleven newly independence Francophone African states formed Air Afrique as a multinational airline. Though conceived as a pan-African enterprise, it had the compromise of France retaining 33% of the capital in exchange for French loans, technical assistance, managers, and technicians. As colonial aviation had been organised around metropolitan routes, governments wanted aviation to serve new capitals, neighbouring countries, and support regional economic centres and tourism. Eventually, as each independent state pulled in different directions, multinational airlines began to dissolve into individual national carriers. East African Airways collapsed in 1977 following political and economic disagreements between Kenya, Uganda, and Tanzania. Air Afrique would also end in 2002.

== Legacy ==
On 9 March 2014, the British Embassy at Cairo and the Children's Civilization & Creativity Centre "Child Museum" jointly held a ceremony to commemorate the centenary of Francis McClean’s Nile expedition. It was held at the Museum's Cinema Hall.

== Bibliography ==
- Jarrige, Pierre (1992). L'aviation légère en Algérie (1909–1939) (PDF) (in French). Pierre Jarrige. ISBN 2-9506620-0-5.
- Barnes, C. H. (1989). Shorts Aircraft Since 1900. London: Putnam Aeronautical Books. ISBN 0-87021-662-7.
