= Skrine =

Skrine is a surname. It may refer to:

- Arthur Wallace Skrine (1885–?), British colonial administrator in Anglo-Egyptian Sudan
- Buster Skrine (born April 26, 1989), U.S. football player
- Sir Clarmont Percival Skrine (1888–1974), British civil servant and administrator of the British Raj; son of Francis.
- Francis Henry Skrine (1847–1933), British civil servant and administrator of the British Raj; father of Sir Clarmont.
