= Stella Court Treatt =

British adventurer, explorer, writer and filmmaker

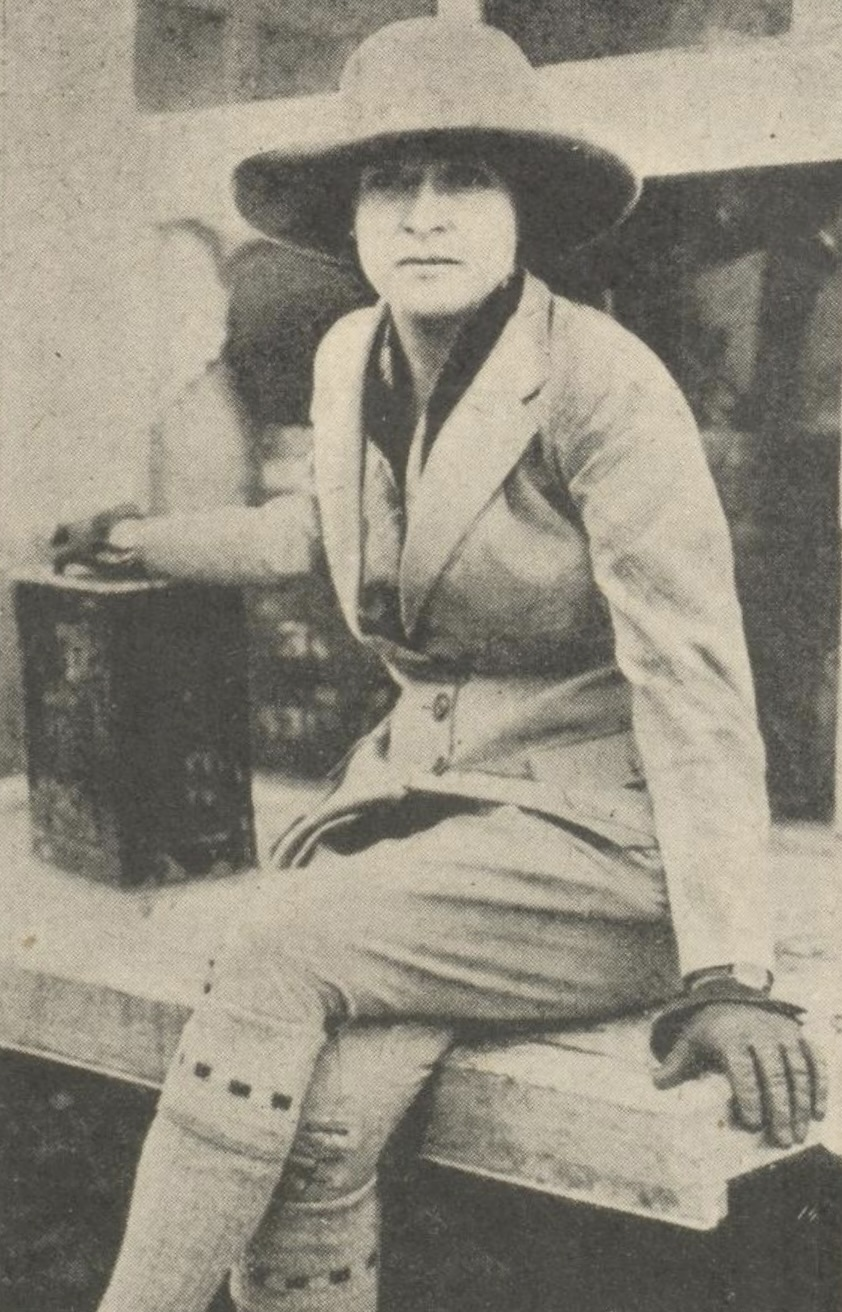
- Court Treatt in 1924, dressed for the expedition
- Born: Stella Maud Hinds; 11 March 1895; Blaauwbank, South Africa
- Died: 20 December 1976 (aged 81); Johannesburg, South Africa
- Occupations: filmmaker, author
- Known for: 1924-1926 motor trip from the Cape to Cairo
- Notable work: Cape to Cairo (1926), Stampede (1929)
- Spouses: Chaplin Court Treatt (m. 1923; div. 1935); Robert Mosley Yeo (m. 1937)

Stella Maud Court Treatt, FRGS (née Hinds; 1895 – 1976) was a South African filmmaker, author, and adventurer who with her first husband Chaplin Court Treatt undertook the Court Treatt Expedition 1924–1926, the first successful attempt to drive a motor car from Cape Town to Cairo.

== Early and personal life ==
Stella Maud Hinds was born in Blaauwbank, the South African Republic, on 11 March 1895. Her father was Thomas Charles Hinds, a burgher of the South African Republic with a farm near Magaliesburg. Stella's sister, (Hilda) Grace Hinds, was the mother of John Cranko, the South African ballet dancer and choreographer. Grace's husband, Herbert Cranko, helped to raise money and secure permissions for Stella's subsequent expedition with Chaplin Court Treatt from the Cape to Cairo.

In 1923, Stella married Major Chaplin Court Treatt, a Royal Flying Corps officer who had been tasked with surveying and constructing airfields for the southern portion of the Trans-African air route. (Note: The southern section of the Imperial Airways trans-African route ran 2,000 miles from Mbala, Zambia (which was then called Abercorn, after the chairman of the British South Africa Company, which ran the town in those days) through Kabwe (then called Broken Hill) and then along the railway linking Kabwe to Cape Town. Kabwe is now located in Zambia, formerly named Northern Rhodesia after Cecil Rhodes, founder of the British South Africa Company.) In 1924, after an interval securing permissions in England, Stella and Chaplin Court Treatt, together with Stella's brother, Errol Hinds, and several others, undertook a seventeen-month car journey from Cape Town to Cairo. In 1926, the Treatts traveled to Anglo-Egyptian Sudan, to film a wildlife documentary. Stella Maud Treatt and Chaplin Court Treatt divorced after several trips together sometime in 1935 or 1936. In 1937, Stella married Robert "Bob" Mosley Yeo, a doctor who had been treating her in South Africa, and they moved to India. Stella eventually returned to South Africa with Robert Yeo. Stella Maud Mosley Yeo died in Johannesburg on 20 December 1976.

== Cape to Cairo Expedition ==
Locations mentioned by Stella Court Treatt in Cape to Cairo: The Record of a Historic Motor Journey (Little, Brown, and Co., 1927).

The Court Treatt expedition was the first successful attempt to drive a motor car from Cape Town ("the Cape"), South Africa, to Cairo, Egypt. (Note: Admittedly the Treatts were beaten by the "Croisière noire" (Citroën central Africa expedition). The expedition was known as the croisière noire (fr. "black cruise") and initiated by André Citroën. It was led by Georges-Marie Haardt and his deputy Louis Audouin-Dubreuil and included Léon Poirier, Georges Specht, Eugène Bergognier, Charles Brull, and Alexandre Iacovleff. They crossed the continent from north to south and arrived in Cape Town in 1925. The Citroën expedition was undertaken with specially adapted Half-track Citroën Type B2 lorries, which were more like tanks than motor cars. See Haardt, Georges-Marie; Audouin-Dubreuil, Louise; Citroën, André (1927). The black journey: across Central Africa with the Citroën Expedition. Cosmopolitan Books.) The party consisted of Stella Court Treatt, Chaplin Court Treatt, Thomas A. Glover, a cinematographer, Fred C. Law, special correspondent for the London Daily Express, Stella's brother Errol, Julius Mapata, the expedition's guide and translator, and Captain F.C. Blunt and Mr. McEleavey, representatives of the Crossley Motor company.

On 13 September 1924, they set off from Cape Town in two Crossley 25/30 cars with light truck bodies. They reached Cairo sixteen months later, on 24 January 1926. Their route was so winding and full of detours that it was reported they had travelled more than 19,000 kilometres (12,000 mi). (Note: Crossley-Motors, op. cit., says 12,732 miles, other sources cite a 13,000-mile figure. See: Skinner, James (5 June 1926). "The Empire as a Car Mart". The Outlook: British Empire Supplement. Vol. LVII, no. 1479. p. xxviii.) The expedition was explicitly modeled after the fashion of Cecil Rhodes' "red line" connecting Cape Town to Cairo, and they restricted their route to territories under British rule. (Note: The idea that came to be most associated with Cecil Rhodes was of an unbroken stretch of territory controlled by the British Empire and running across the entire African continent. The name comes from the practice of coloring the territory of the British Empire red or pink on maps. See the All-Red Route.) Fred Law's account of the beginning of the trip, Woman Pioneer of Empire: Cape to Cairo venture Begun (Daily Express, 24 September 1924), began with an invocation of Rhodes' vision of a network of roads and railroads linking up British colonial possessions to afford white settlement and the more effective domination of the continent and its people: "The second step towards the fulfilment of Cecil Rhodes' scheme to open up the routes through darkest Africa began this morning, when Major and Mrs. C. Court Treatt left Capetown in an attempt to reach Cairo by motorcar." Stella observed the difficulties that the imperial route presented; "[had we taken an alternative route] our problems would have been simplified [. . .] we would have found roads [. . .] and we could have avoided bridgeless rivers and swamps. But the desirability of blazing a trail through British Africa was superior to every other consideration." Their route took them from Cape Town through Britstown, Pretoria, Polokwane (formerly, Pietersburg), Bulawayo (in Zimbabwe, formerly, Rhodesia, where they visited Cecil Rhodes' grave), Livingstone (in Zambia, formerly Northern Rhodesia), Kabwe (in Zambia, formerly called Broken Hill), (Note: See note 1.) Mbala (in Zambia, formerly called Abercorn), Karonga (Malawi, formerly Nyasaland), Mwaya (Tanzania, formerly Tanganyika), Nairobi (Kenya), Mongalla (South Sudan, formerly the Anglo-Egyptian Sudan), Rumbek, Wau, Al-Ubayyid (Sudan, formerly Anglo-Egyptian Sudan; spelled, 'El Obeid,' by Treatt), Ed Dueim, Khartoum, Wadi Halfa, and finally Aswan (Egypt) to Cairo in Egypt.

=== Southern Sudan ===
The expedition left Nairobi on 10 October 1925 and reached Mongala eight days later, where they were received by Major Roy Brock, Deputy governor of Mongalla Province. After declining an offer to transport their cars by steamer to bypass the Sudd, South Sudan's great central wetlands, they set off again on 25 October 1925 with the aim of reaching Terekeka, which lay about 100 kilometres (60 mi) north. Their route took them through Rumbek, Tonj, Aweil, and across the Lol River and then the Kiir River and eventually to Muglad and Al-Ubayyid, which they reached on 20 December 1925. They rarely made more than 13 kilometres (8 mi) per day, frequently needing to rely on people (often hundreds at a time) living along the route to drag and pull and raft or float their cars across rivers and haul them through swamps.

=== Arrival in Cairo ===
The Treatts completed the objective of their expedition on 24 January 1926 when they arrived in Cairo. After stopping briefly for Christmas at Al-Ubayyid, they resumed their journey on Christmas morning, reaching the west bank of the Nile River on 27 December, and spent the night at El Doueim, where they were provided lodging by the Governor of Anglo-Egyptian Sudan while a steamer transported their cars across the Nile to the east side. They arrived at Khartoum on 28 December, drove to Omdurman across a bridge at the confluence of the White Nile and Blue Nile on 29 December, and spent New Year's Eve at the small town of Shendi. On 5 January 1926, they reached Halfa in Egypt, getting to Luxor on 20 January and were on relatively good roads on the last leg of their trip. On the morning of 24 January, they were welcomed by the press and a reception committee at the pyramids of Giza, and drove past crowds of well wishers along the Kasr el Nil road, arriving in Cairo in the afternoon to finish the first trip by motor vehicle from Cape Town to Cairo.

=== Return to England ===
When the Treatts returned to England, "their journey was celebrated as a triumph of the British spirit and the superiority of British engineering." In 1927, not long after their return, Stella published Cape to Cairo: The Record of a Historic Motor Journey and the film of the expedition, Cape to Cairo, was screened in Britain and the United States, "accompanied by lectures and numerous interviews starring the glamorous Stella Court Treatt". Newspapers and advertisers transformed the Treatts into celebrities, with Crossley Motors and the North British Rubber Company running advertisements alongside interviews with Stella.

The General Strike of 1926, which began three months after their return to England, provided a backdrop for Stella's account of the Treatt expedition.

Cars proved to be an effective and flexible response to working-class organization, especially to the power of the railway unions, and Stella Court Treatt's account of one of the major dramas of their expedition, their struggle with "labor relations" in Africa, resonated with the domestic struggles being fought out in British industrial relations as she wrote. She detailed their difficulty in directing the uncooperative native labor that had been assigned to them by British administrators as a micropolitics of imposing their will on a resisting colonial proletariat.

— Georgine Clarson, Eat My Dust: Early Women Motorists, 2008, Johns Hopkins University Press, pp. 146.

Stella met King George V and Queen Mary at Buckingham Palace, and her portrait was taken by the London photography firm Bassano Ltd, Royal Photographers.

== Sudan Expedition ==
In 1928, after spending two years in England, the Treatts set out again for Sudan to make a moving picture of Sudan's wildlife. Their trip began at Port Sudan and continued the length of the railway to El Obeid, taking the Treatts through places like Abu Gabra that they had visited during their earlier Cape-to-Cairo expedition. Two motion pictures were produced, Stampede (1930) and Stark Nature (1930).

Stampede is a romance scripted by Stella that concerns a man named Boru and how he found love with Loweno and ended up a "Sheikh", after first being orphaned, when his mother was killed by a lion, and adopted by a Habbaniya sheikh, who subsequently loses his life along with his son during a drought, thus opening up the position of sheikh for Boru. The film is organized around a racist visual trope of 'primitive Africans' and their close linkages to wildlife.

Stark Nature (1930) was also organized around a similar visual trope of 'primitive Africans' and 'modern Europeans.' The film opens with cabaret dancing in London to supply a contrast with African dance. In Sudan Sand: filming the baggara Arabs (1930) Stella describes building an artificial river to provide a suitable setting for a wildlife film: "there is more forest than we know what to do with. The real difficulty lies in finding a suitable forest with a natural water course running in the same place." Much like the narrative of Cape to Cairo (1927), the story of Sudan Sand (1930) revolves around the difficulties that the Treatts encountered in trying to compel colonial subjects to dig a river without compensation or adequate tools or any obvious purpose in the heat of Equatorial Africa. (Note: Stella's claim that African colonial subjects were "primitive" and "lazy" was a common justification for colonial rule. See Syed Hussein Alatas (1977). The Myth of the Lazy Native: A Study of the Image of the Malays, Filipinos and Javanese from the 16th to the 20th Century and Its Function in the Ideology of Colonial Capitalism. Routledge. ISBN 978-1-136-27648-4.)

A lot of men have been at work on the 'river,' and it is beginning to look quite convincing, although, because of the laziness of the Arabs it is still quite shallow.

— Stella Court Treatt, Sudan Sand: filming the baggara Arabs, 1930, George G. Harrap & Company Ltd., pp. 72.

Stark Nature (1930) received mixed reviews. Some complained that all the cutting between "primitive and modern" dance sequences was overwrought; others wrote that the narrative was too artificial for a "Nature film."

== Published works ==
=== Writing ===
- Treatt, Stella Court (1940). "Kima (from Sudan Sand)". In Body, Alfred Harris (ed.). Animals All: An Anthology for Schools. Cambridge University Press. pp. 37–39.
- Treatt, Stella (1930). Sudan Sand: filming the baggara Arabs. London: George G. Harrap & Company Ltd.
- Treatt, Stella Court (1930). Stampede: A Romance of Arab Life. London: Hutchinson & Company, Limited.
- Treatt, Stella Court (1927). Cape to Cairo: The Record of a Historic Motor Journey. Boston: Little, Brown, and Company.

=== Filmography ===
- Stella Court Treatt (co-director) (1926). Cape to Cairo (Motion Picture).
- Stella Court Treatt (co-director, script writer) (1929). Stampede (Motion Picture).
- Stella Court Treatt (co-director, script writer) (1930). Africa in Flames (re-release of Stampede) (Motion Picture).
- Stella Court Treatt (co-director, script writer) (1930). Stark Nature (Motion Picture).

== See also ==
- Cape to Cairo Road
- Cecil Rhodes
- All-Red Route
- Imperial Airways
- Crossley Motors
- List of female explorers and travelers
