= Governor Cameron =

Governor Cameron may refer to:

- Angus Cameron (colonial administrator) (1871–1961), Governor of Mongalla Province from 1906 to 1908
- Charles Cameron (colonial administrator) (1766–1820), Governor of the Bahamas from 1804 to 1820
- Donald Charles Cameron (colonial administrator) (1872–1948), Governor of Tanganyika from 1925 to 1931 and 4th Governor of Nigeria from 1931 to 1935
- Edward John Cameron (1858–1947), Governor of the Gambia from 1914 to 1920
- William E. Cameron (1842–1927), 39th Governor of Virginia
