= Chauncey Hugh Stigand =

British army officer, colonial administrator, and hunter

Captain Chauncey Hugh Stigand

Governor of Upper Nile Province
- In office 1917–1918

Governor of Mongalla Province
- In office February 1919 – December 1919
- Preceded by: Cecil Stephen Northcote
- Succeeded by: Vincent Reynolds Woodland

Personal details
- Born: 1877 Boulogne-sur-Mer
- Died: December 1919 (aged 41–42) Pap, South Sudan
- Resting place: Tombé, South Sudan

Chauncey Hugh Stigand OBE FRGS FZS (1877–1919) was a British army officer, colonial administrator, and big game hunter. He was killed in action while attempting to suppress a rebellion of Aliab Dinka.

== Biography ==
Stigand was the son of William Stigand and Agnes Catherine Senior. His father was British vice-consul at Boulogne-sur-Mer when he was born there on 25 October 1877. He was educated at Radley and gazetted as a second lieutenant in the Royal West Kent Regiment on 4 January 1899. Serving with them in Burma and British Somaliland, he was promoted to lieutenant on 13 March 1901. He transferred to British East Africa and was seconded to serve with the King's African Rifles in December 1902.

He entered the Egyptian army in 1910 and was posted to the Upper White Nile, assuming control of the Lado Enclave from the Belgians in accordance with an agreement. He was placed in charge of the Kajo Kaji district.

In 1915 Stigand was promoted to major. In 1916 he served in the campaign against 'Ali Dinar in Darfur. He was Inspector at Nasir from 1915–16 and governor of the Upper Nile province from 1917 to 1918. Stigand was appointed governor of Mongalla Province in 1919. He was killed on 8 December 1919 by tribesmen of the Aliyab Dinka at Pap, between the Lau River and the White Nile.

He married in 1913 Nancy Yulee Neff of Washington, D.C., and had one child, Florida Yulee Agnes, born 1917.

== Bibliography ==
Stigand was a prolific writer.

- Chauncy Hugh Stigand, Denis D. Lyell (1906). Central African game and its spoor. H. Cox.
- Chauncy Hugh Stigand (1907). Scouting and reconnaissance in savage countries. Hugh Rees, ltd.
- Chauncy Hugh Stigand (1909). The game of British East Africa. H. Cox.
- Chauncy Hugh Stigand (1910). To Abyssinia through an unknown land: an account of a journey through unexplored regions of British East Africa by Lake Rudolf to the kingdom of Menelek. J.B. Lippincott.
- Chauncy Hugh Stigand (1914). Administration in tropical Africa. Constable & company, ltd.
- Chauncey Hugh Stigand (1913). The land of Zinj: being an account of British East Africa, its ancient history and present inhabitants. Routledge. ISBN 0-7146-1723-7.
- Chauncey Hugh Stigand (1913). Hunting the elephant in Africa: and other recollections of thirteen years wanderings. Macmillan Co.
- Chauncey Hugh Stigand (1914). Black tales for white children: Being a collection of Swahili stories.
- Chauncey Hugh Stigand (1915). A grammar of dialectic changes in the Kiswahili language. University Press.
- Chauncy Hugh Stigand, Nancy Yulee Neff Stigand (1915). Cooking for settler and trekker. Field Press Ltd.
- C H Stigand (1916). Observations On Northern Section Of The Tanganyika-Nile Rift Valley. Royal Geographical Society., London.
- Chauncy Hugh Stigand (1923). A Nuer-English vocabulary. The University Press.
- Chauncey Hugh Stigand, Sir Francis Reginald Wingate (1923). Equatoria: the Lado Enclave. Constable.

== See also ==
- List of famous big game hunters
