= Cairo to Cape Town air route =

The Cairo to Cape Town air route was a pioneering trans-African aerial corridor commencing at Cairo and ending at Cape Town. Planning began in October 1918 nearing the end of the First World War. When the Royal Air Force was available, three parties were formed to conduct surveys were dispatched into Africa in December 1918. The Heliopolis to Khartoum section had been completed by January 1919, and the route was fully completed and declared open by December that year. In the following years, aviators would attempt to set records along the Cairo to Cape Town route.

== History ==
=== Planning ===
As early as 1913, there were plans conceived to connect Cairo and Cape Town as a continuous route in other forms of transport. On 30 August 1913, Captain Kelsey with five companions, attempted a motor expedition from Cape Town northwards towards Cairo. In January 1914, French aviator Jules Védrines had considered the possibility of flying the Cairo to Cape Town route. In April 1914, a £500 prize was offered by a newspaper company for anyone who completed a successful flight on the route, or to the first pilot to reach Johannesburg. In February 1918, the British Civil Aerial Transport Committee was considering the post-war development of imperial air routes. The committee then put forwarded the recommendation of surveying routes to link the Empire. Following Turkish surrender on 31 October 1918, GOC Royal Air Force (RAF) Middle East, Major General William G. H. Salmond began planning the surveying and construction of landing grounds between Cairo and Cape Town. The end of the war had made RAF personnel and aircraft available for surveying works. Apart from the landing ground at Khartoum, there were none south of Heliopolis.

=== Development ===
Subsequently, three newly formed RAF survey and construction parties were instructed to survey their sectors and cooperate with local colonial administrations. In late December 1918, they were dispatched into Africa to commence on their assigned sections. Landing grounds would be constructed at intervals of roughly 200 miles or less. The No. 1 African Survey Party covered Cairo to Nimule, No. 2 African Survey Party covered Nimule to Abercorn, and the No. 3 African Survey Party, commanded by Major Chaplin Court Treatt, covered Abercone to Cape Town via Broken Hill. Work began in January 1919, guided by RAF Commanding Officer Major General Salmond. In many places, aerodromes would have to be cut out of dense jungle, and involved felling thousands of trees and digging up their roots. Additionally, the soil of anthills had to be removed by hand and carried away in native baskets. In each stop, a large cleared and levelled patch of ground would be prepared, accompanied with a stock of fuel. Many of the fields would have a landing ground of 750 x 750 metres. The resulting route comprised a north-south network of 24 airfields and 19 emergency landing grounds. Some were formed in grasslands, some as a tropical jungle strip, and some were established in existing outposts in the deserts. By January 1919, the route between Heliopolis and Khartoum had been completed in time for an inspection carried out by Brigadier General Philip L. W. Herbert by a Handley Page HP.0/400 that month.

Heliopolis (Cairo) to Nimule

Between Heliopolis in Egypt and Nimule in Sudan, a total of 21 landing grounds (excluding Heliopolis and Nimule) were established. The easiest section was reported to be between Cairo and Lake Victoria. Along the Nile, there were sufficient telegraph and railway connections, providing communication links for the landing grounds.

Nimule to Abercorn

Between Nimule in Sudan and Abercorn in Northern Rhodesia, a total of 7 landing grounds were established (excluding Nimule and Abercorn) via Uganda, British East Africa (Kenya), and ex-German East Africa (Tanganyika). As Kituta was laden with mosquito-infested swamps, Abercorn was instead selected. Entering the central region of Africa, much of the land was covered in dense bush and tropical forests. Further difficulties that the parties experienced included shortages of water, frequent infestations of mosquitos, and having to handle white ants.

Abercorn to Cape Town

Between Abercorn in Northern Rhodesia and Cape Town in South Africa, a total of 11 landing grounds (excluding Abercorn and Cape Town) were established via Southern Rhodesia and Bechuanaland.

=== Opening ===
At the end of December 1919, the Air Ministry declared the Cairo-Cape Town route open, and several expeditions intending to complete the trans-Saharan journey began. In 1920, two South African military aviators Lieutenant Colonel Pierre van Ryneveld and Major Christopher Joseph Quintin Brand had intended to follow the newly surveyed Cairo-Cape Town air route. They departed from Brooklands, England on 4 February 1920 in the Vickers Vimy "Silver Queen", crossing the Mediterranean and reached Derna in Libya. They then continued towards Egypt and Sudan, however their first Vimy was forced to land in the Wadi Halfa area due to issues from the engine's radiator. In Egypt, they obtained a second Vickers Vimy, named the "Silver Queen II". On 28 February 1920, they arrived at Abercorn in Rhodesia, becoming the first aeroplane to land in the colony. Flying via Ndola, Broken Hill, and Livingstone, they landed at the Bulawayo racecourse on 5 March. On 6 March, it was wrecked at Bulawayo in Southern Rhodesia, and a de Havilland DH.9 named "Voortrekker" was then sent north from South Africa. On 17 March, Van Ryneveld and Brand resumed the journey on their new aircraft southward from Bulawayo. They successfully completed the first trans-African crossing after landing at Youngsfield, Wynberg in Capetown at 4:00 PM, 20 March. The total journey spanned 45 days, with a flying time of 109 hours and 30 minutes. By changing aircraft, they were disqualified from the £10,000 prize they hoped to win.

The first aeroplane landing in Salisbury by Thompson and Rutherford, at the Salisbury racecourse in Southern Rhodesia, taken on 11 June 1920.

Van Ryneveld and Brandh were not alone in the trans-African mission, having major competitors alongside them. A Times-sponsored Vickers Vimy flown by Captain Stanley Cockerell and Captain Frank Broome, with zoologist Dr. P. Chalmers Mitchell aboard left England in January 1920. They had reached considerably farther than most other attempts, and Dr Chalmer Mitchell's Vimy arrived at Tabora on 26 February. On the morning of 27 February, the Vimy's engine failed during take-off, and ran into the surrounding vegetation damaging it beyond repair. The party aboard was not seriously injured. Van Ryneveld and Brand were also flying nearby during their attempt, however they passed west of Tabora due to a navigation error. As a result, they did not notice the wreckage where the Times party could be assisted.

== Route ==
The following is the approximate Cairo to Cape Town air route.

Country/territory	Route	Distance	Coordinates	Accommodation & fuel
Egypt	Heliopolis – Helwan	18 mi	30°6′N 31°20′E	Petrol, oil & water. Rail, road & telegraph. Accommodation for aeroplanes and personnel.
Egypt	Helwan – Wasta	40 mi	29°20′N 31°12′E	Water. Rail & telegraph.
Egypt	Wasta – Samamut	76 mi	28°18′N 30°42′E	
Egypt	Samamut – Assiut	84 mi	27°10′N 31°12′E	Petrol, oil & water. Rail & telegraph.
Egypt	Assiut – Kara	102 mi	26°05′N 30°03′E	Water. Rail & telegraph.
Egypt	Kara – Luxor	44 mi	25°43′N 32°38′E	Water. Rail & telegraph.
Egypt	Luxor – Edfu	55 mi	24°57′N 32°52′E	Water. Rail & telegraph.
Egypt	Edfu – Aswan	60 mi	24°05′N 32°54′E	Petrol, oil & water. Rail & telegraph. Accommodation for personnel.
Egypt	Aswan – El Ajaqui	66 mi	23°08′N 32°45′E	Water. Telegraph & steamer.
Egypt	El Ajaqui – Toshki Gharb	71 mi	22°30′N 31°52′E	Water. Telegraph & steamer.
Sudan	Toshki Gharb – Wadi Halfa		21°55′N 31°18′E	Petrol, oil (bulk delivery within 7 days) & water. Rail & telegraph. Accommodation for personnel.
Sudan	Wadi Halfa – Station 6	54 mi	20°45′N 32°35′E	Water. Rail & telegraph.
Sudan	Station 6 – Station 10	82 mi	19°42′N 33°08′E	Water. Rail & telegraph.
Sudan	Station 10 – Shereik	80 mi	18°47′N 33°35′E	Water. Rail.
Sudan	Shereik – Atbara	70 mi	17°42′N 33°58′E	Petrol, oil & water. Rail & telegraph.
Sudan	Atbara – Shendi	76 mi	16°42′N 33°26′E	Petrol, oil & water. Rail & telegraph.
Sudan	Shendi – Khartoum	74 mi	15°37′N 32°32′E	Petrol, oil & water. Road, rail & telegraph. Accommodation for personnel.
Sudan	Khartoum – Jebelein	208 mi	12°37′N 32°53′E	Petrol, oil & water. Steamer.
Sudan	Jebelein – Eliri	221 mi	10°14′N 30°42′E	Petrol (444), oil (Castrol 110) & water. Telegraph.
Sudan	Eliri – Duk Farwill	198 mi	7°30′N 31°36′E	Water. Telegraph.
Sudan	Duk Farwill – Mongalla	159 mi	5°12′N 31°47′E	Petrol (1214), oil (Castrol 110) & water. Telegraph & wireless.
Sudan	Mongalla – Nimule	110 mi	3°36′N 32°03′E	Petrol (500), oil (Castrol 20) & water. Rail & telegraph. Accommodation for personnel.
Uganda Protectorate	Nimule – Jinja	232 mi	0°27′N 33°13′E	
British East Africa	Jinja – Kisumu	113 mi	0°05′N 34°46′E	Petrol (1000), oil (Castrol 50) & water. Rail, steamer & telegraph.
British East Africa	Kisumu – Shirati	89 mi	1°07′S 34°00′E	Water. Rail, steamer & telegraph.
British East Africa	Shirati – Mwanza	124 mi	2°32′S 32°55′E	Petrol (570), oil (Castrol 48) & water. Steamer. Accommodation for personnel.
British East Africa	Mwanza – Shinyanga	79 mi	3°36′S 33°20′E	Steamer & telegraph.
British East Africa	Shinyanga – Tabora	104 mi	5°01′S 32°50′E	Petrol (772), oil (Castrol 127) & water. Rail & telegraph. Accommodation for personnel.
British East Africa	Tabora – Zimba	207 mi	7°52′S 31°52′E	Water. Rail & telegraph.
Northern Rhodesia	Zimba – Abercorn		8°49′S 31°23′E	Petrol (800), oil (Castrol 120) & water. Telegraph.
Northern Rhodesia	Abercorn – Ndola	79 mi	12°58′S 28°38′E	Water. Rail & telegraph.
Northern Rhodesia	Ndola – Broken Hill	336 mi	14°27′S 28°27′E	Water. Rail & telegraph.
Northern Rhodesia	Broken Hill – Livingstone	103 mi	17°50′S 25°48′E	
Southern Rhodesia	Livingstone – Bulawayo	238 mi	20°10′S 28°30′E	Petrol, oil & water. Rail & telegraph.
Bechuanaland Protectorate	Bulawayo – Palapye	182 mi	22°32′S 27°15′E	Water. Rail.
Union of South Africa	Palapye – Pretoria	258 mi	25°53′S 29°06′E	Petrol (3000), oil (Castrol 200) & water. Rail & telegraph. Accommodation for personnel.
Union of South Africa	Pretoria – Johannesburg	64 mi	26°11′S 28°07′E	Petrol, oil (bulk delivery within 7 days) & water. Rail & telegraph. Accommodation for personnel.
Union of South Africa	Johannesburg – Bloemfontein	230 mi	29°05′S 26°13′E	
Union of South Africa	Bloemfontein – Victoria West	243 mi	31°24′S 23°07′E	Petrol, oil (bulk delivery within 7 days) & water. Rail & telegraph. Accommodation for personnel.
Union of South Africa	Victoria West – Beaufort West	72 mi	32°20′S 22°35′E	Petrol (206), oil (Castrol 32) & water. Steamer.
Union of South Africa	Beaufort West – Touws River	158 mi	33°17′S 20°05′E	Petrol (100), oil (Castrol 50) & water. Rail & telegraph. Accommodation for personnel.
Union of South Africa	Touws River – Cape Town	142 mi	33°56′S 18°30′E	Petrol (3000), oil (Castrol 200) & water. Rail & telegraph. Accommodation for aeroplanes and personnel.
