= Governor Northcote =

Governor Northcote may refer to:

- Henry Northcote, 1st Baron Northcote (1846–1911), Governor of Bombay from 1900 to 1903 and 3rd Governor-General of Australia from 1904 to 1908
- Cecil Stephen Northcote (1878–1945), Governor of Mongalla Province in the Anglo-Egyptian Sudan from 1918 to 1919, and then of the Nuba Mountains province from 1919 to 1927
- Geoffry Northcote (1881–1948), 20th Governor of Hong Kong from 1937 to 1941
