= Governor Owen =

Governor Owen may refer to:

- John Owen (North Carolina politician) (1787–1841), 24th Governor of North Carolina
- Roger Carmichael Robert Owen (1866–1941), Governor of Mongalla Province in South Sudan from 1908 to 1918

== See also ==
- Bill Owens (Colorado politician) (born 1950), 40th Governor of Colorado
