= Aliab Dinka =

People of South Sudan

The Aliab Dinka are a subdivision of the Dinka people of South Sudan. They traditionally lived in an area west of the upper White Nile river. The name is also used to refer to a breed of cattle maintained by the Aliab Dinka people and widespread in the region.

== Location ==
The Aliab Dinka mainly live in the Lakes State of South Sudan, in the Awerial County, to the west of the White Nile. The Aliab Valley is a low floodplain to the west of the Bahr-el-Gebel (Nile) between Tombé in Terekeka County in the south and Lake Papiu in Yirol East County in the north. The valley is between 2.5 miles (4.0 km) and 6 miles (9.7 km) wide and perhaps 60 kilometres (37 mi) in length. The Bahr-el-Gebel flows well above the east side of the valley between high banks. During the rainy season, usually starting in June, the river overflows its banks and floods the whole valley, which becomes a huge swamp. After the southern half of the valley has drained, between December and April it is suitable for cattle grazing. A report from 1951 said that some Dinka hunted the abundant game during this period, particularly buffalo.

== 1919 uprising ==
In 1919 the Aliab Dinka country lay within the Mongalla Province of the Anglo-Egyptian Sudan. There was an uprising of the Aliab Dinka that year. 3,000 Dinka men attacked the police post at Mingkaman ( Guol-yier ), near Bor, and killed several policemen. Mandari tribesmen in the region to the south attacked at the same time and killed some telegraph linesmen and police. Lieutenant Colonel Richard Finch White took several companies of the Egyptian Army Equatorial Battalion to the area to handle the situation. The Mongalla province Governor Chauncey Hugh Stigand went on patrol himself, and on 8 December 1919 was killed at Pap, between the Lau River and the White Nile. Two other officers and 24 soldiers and porters were speared to death by 1,000 Dinka warriors. The rising was put down harshly in 1920. A force under Colonel Robert Henry Darwall led the punitive expedition, which killed over 400 Dinka, Atwot and Mandari tribesmen, burnt many villages and took about 7,000 cattle.

Stigand's successor Vincent Reynolds Woodland wrote that "The Government has done nothing for the Aliab. It has not protected them from aggression, has given them no economic benefits ... it has forced them to do a certain amount of labour, to pay taxes and to endure a not negligible amount of extortion by police". However, although he removed the Egyptian ma'mur at Minkammon who had triggered the Aliab revolt through his abuses, Woodland did not appoint a replacement. The Aliab Dinka were left with no administration at all.

== Conflicts ==
The Aliab Dinka have traditionally been primarily pastoral in occupation, although they engage in some agriculture. In the past, the Aliab Dinka had a close relationship with the Mandari people. In the dry season, the Mandari would graze the Aliab grasslands beside the Nile. In return, the Aliab Dinka would share the Mandari woodland grazing in the rainy season. In times of shortage, however, there has been conflict between the Aliab and Bor Dinka and the Mandari. During the period starting in 1972 with the end of the First Sudanese Civil War the Aliab Dinka used their control of administrative posts to undermine the old agreements on dry season grazing. When hostilities resumed in 1983 with the Second Sudanese Civil War there was a violent reaction against the Dinka, with many being killed by the Mundari in Juba.

Conflict flared up between the Aliab Dinka and the Mandari again in November 2009. About 40 people were killed in a dispute over grazing land on the border of Aliap and Terekeka counties during a period of water shortage. Nine of the Dinka were killed and about 31 Mundari men were shot dead by the more heavily armed Dinka. The Aliap Dinka claimed that the Mandari had been the aggressors, abducting five women and four children and stealing 20 cows.
