= Arthur Wallace Skrine =

British colonial governor (1885–1966)

Governor of Mongalla Province
- In office 7 November 1924 – 4 August 1929
- Preceded by: Vincent Reynolds Woodland
- Succeeded by: Francis Balfour

Personal details
- Born: 21 March 1885
- Died: 12 January 1966 (aged 80)

Arthur Wallace Skrine (1885–1966) was a British colonial administrator who was governor of Mongalla Province in the South of the Anglo-Egyptian Sudan from 1924 to 1929.

Skrine was born on 21 March 1885, son of Duncan William Hume Skrine and his wife Amy, née Hanham, the third of five children. He attended Trinity College, Glenalmond, and Oxford University. In 1927 he married Evelyn (born in Stroud, Gloucestershire in 1894), daughter of Frederick Winterbotham.

Joining the Sudan Political Service, Skrine served in Khartoum in 1908, in Fung Province from 1909 to 1912, in Dongola from 1913 to 1917 and in Kassala from 1918 to 1922. He was assistant to Willis in 1923–1924. In December 1922, as deputy governor of Kassala province, he signed an agreement with Dr. Agenore Frangipani to rectify the border between Eritrea and Sudan. The British-Italian agreement was written in French, still the common diplomatic language. The agreement was ratified through an exchange of notes between Benito Mussolini and ambassador Sir R. Graham on 19 May 1924.

Skrine was governor of Mongalla from 1924 until 1929. On 6 November 1929 he was granted the Insignia of the Third Class of the Order of the Nile.

He died at the Stonehanger Nursing Home, Salcombe, Devon, on 12 January 1966.

== Bibliography ==
- A. W. Skrine (1 December 1924). Notes regarding Chiefs Courts and Native Administration in Mongalla Province.
- A. W. Skrine (March 1929). Notes on Current Topics in Mongalla Province.
