= Vincent Reynolds Woodland =

British administrator (1879–1933)

Governor of Mongalla
- In office 1920 – 6 October 1924
- Preceded by: Chauncey Hugh Stigand
- Succeeded by: Arthur Wallace Skrine

Personal details
- Born: 1879 Hammerwood, Sussex, England
- Died: 11 December 1933 aged 54 Warbleton, Sussex, England

Vincent Reynolds Woodland (1879 – 11 December 1933) was a British colonial administrator who was governor of Mongalla Province of the southern Anglo-Egyptian Sudan from 1920 to 1924.

VR Woodland was born in 1879 and educated at Marlborough College and Trinity Hall, Cambridge. He married Jeannie Claudine Leighton and had two children called Frances Anne and John. He joined the Sudan Political Service in 1904.

Woodland was Governor of Mongalla Province from 1920 to 1924, when he retired from the service. He was appointed after the former governor Chauncey Hugh Stigand had killed in October 1919 while trying to suppress a revolt by tribesmen of the Aliyab Dinka. The Aliab Dinka rising was put down harshly in 1920. Woodland wrote that "The Government has done nothing for the Aliab. It has not protected them from aggression, has given them no economic benefits ... it has forced them to do a certain amount of labour, to pay taxes and to endure a not negligible amount of extortion by police". However, although he removed the Egyptian ma'mur at Minkammon who had triggered the Aliab revolt through his abuses, Woodland did not appoint a replacement. The Aliab Dinka were left with no administration at all.

In 1920 the Nuer attacked both the Dinka and the Burun people on the border with Ethiopia. Woodland said of Mongala in 1920 that it was "in such a muck-up state he doesn't know where to start". The British were ambivalent about their policy for administration of the South Sudan. Woodland called for a decision. Either South Sudan should be separated from the north and administered as a territory in the same way as Uganda, or the British should encourage development by the Arabs within the structure of the North Sudan.

Woodland had to restrain his commissioners from taking an expansionary approach in eastern Mongalla. Talking of the Toposa people of the east, who were threatening the Didinga of Mongalla, he said "All recent reports of 'the Toposa' attitude towards the government indicate that they must be broken before they will submit to control. Nothing is to be gained by visiting them unless the government intends to occupy and administer their country". While Woodland was handicapped by lack of resources, an excellently equipped team of surveyors, engineers and hydrologists undertook a thorough study of the question of a Sudd canal while he was governor. A canal through the vast swampland of the Sudd would open the south of Sudan to navigation, drain the swamps to create agricultural land and by reducing loss through evaporation would increase water available further downstream in north Sudan and Egypt.

In 1922 Woodland was appointed to the 3rd Class of the Order of the Nile by the King of Egypt. Woodland left office on 6 October 1924.
