= Roger Carmichael Robert Owen =

Governor of Mongalla Province, Sudan, (1866–1941) to 1918

Lieutenant-Colonel Roger Carmichael Robert Owen
- R.C.R. Owen in Khartoum, 1919, photographed by Bedřich Machulka

Governor of Mongalla
- In office 1908–1918
- Preceded by: Angus Cameron
- Succeeded by: Cecil Stephen Northcote

Personal details
- Born: 1866 Writtle, Essex, England
- Died: 1 August 1941 (aged 74-75) Cairo, Egypt
- Awards: Companion of the Order of St Michael and St George; Officer of the Order of the British Empire; Grand Officer of the Order of the Nile; Order of the Medjidie

Military service
- Years of service: 1884–1918
- Unit: King's Shropshire Light Infantry; Oxfordshire Light Infantry; Egyptian Army

Lieutenant-Colonel Roger Carmichael Robert Owen CMG OBE (1866–1941) was a British Army officer who joined the Sudan service in 1903. He was Sudan Agent in Cairo from 1905 to 1908. Owen was then appointed Governor of Mongalla Province in South Sudan from 1908 to 1918.

== Early life ==
Owen was born in 1866 in Writtle, Essex, England the son of the local vicar the Reverend Loftus Owen and his wife Emma (née Kenworthy). He was educated at Rossall School, where he was a noted athlete. In August 1884 he was commissioned in 3rd Battalion, The King's Shropshire Light Infantry. In 1888 he transferred to The Oxfordshire Light Infantry.

== India ==
Owen was Superintendent of Army Signalling with the Manipur Expedition of 1891, and in the same year was also with the Wuntho Expedition in Upper Burma. He served in the First Mohmand Campaign between 1897 and 1898 and the Tirah Expedition which included operations in the Bara Valley and the Khyber Pass. He was severely wounded while fighting in the Khyber Pass.

== Egypt ==
In 1902 Owen was appointed to the Egyptian Army. He held various posts in Egypt including being Director of the Intelligence Department of the Egyptian War Office. In that position, he was asked whether the Bedouin of Sinai would side with Britain or Turkey in the event of a war. His short-sighted view was "...It matters very little to us which side they take in such a case, as if such a war took place (and no one expects it even will). There would be no fighting in Sinai – it would be somewhere else". This was ironic in view of the later exploits of T. E. Lawrence in the Arab Revolt against the Turks. In 1906 Owen was a member of the Sinai Boundary Commission. He was appointed a Companion of the Order of St Michael and St George (CMG) that year.

From 1905 to 1908 Owen was the Sudan Agent in Cairo. In 1905 Owen was approached by a Canadian missionary group for permission to work in Bahr el Ghazal. According to Owen they were "the horrible fanatical canting kind of missionary and undesirable". He painted a bleak picture of conditions in the Sudan and "I even went nearly so far as to suggest they might be served up as missionary mayonnaise". The missionaries dropped their request.

== Sudan ==
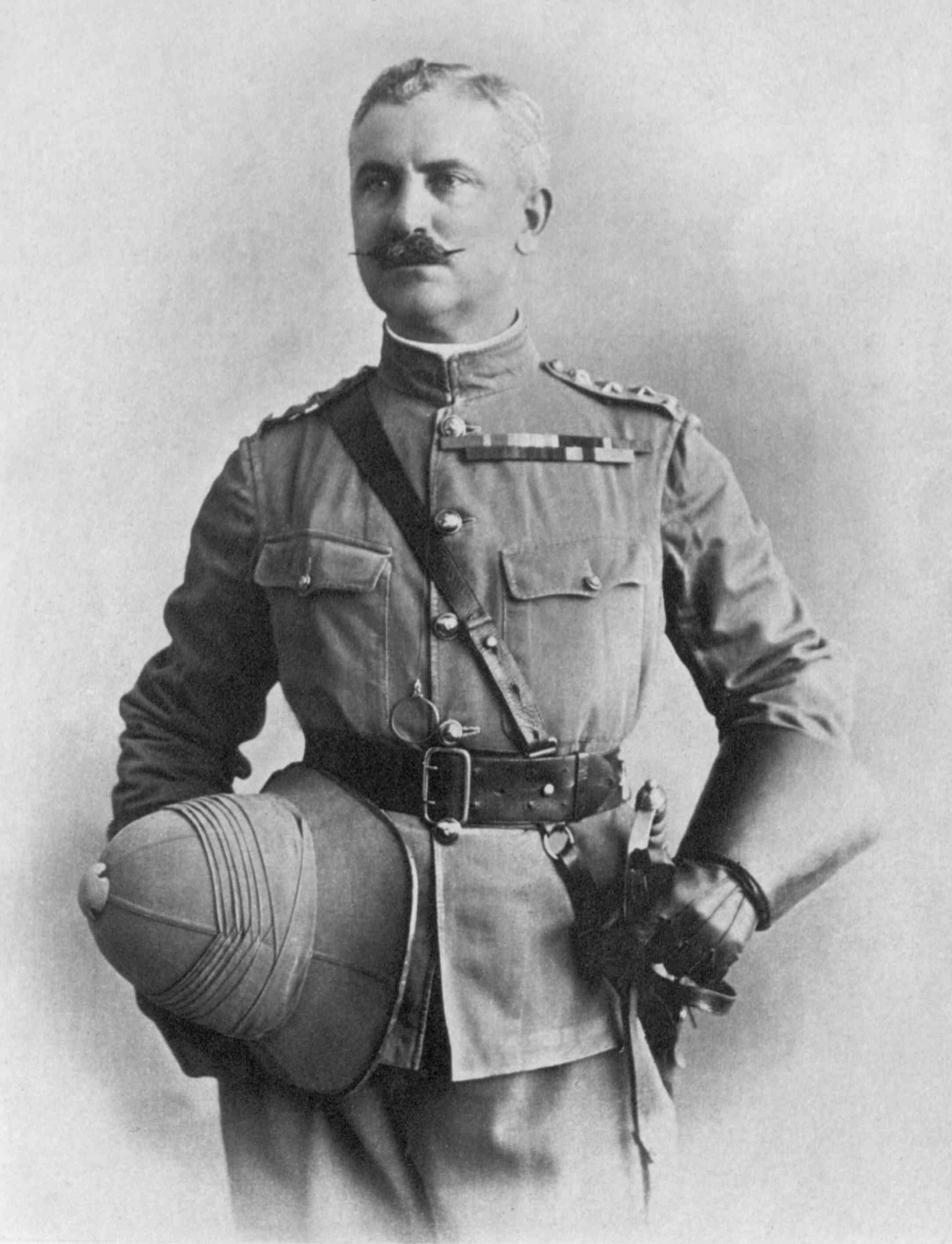
General Sir Francis Reginald Wingate, Governor General of the Anglo-Egyptian Sudan

IN 1908 Owen was appointed Governor and Officer Commanding the Military District of Mongalla Province in Sudan. In February 1910 Theodore Roosevelt visited the province. Owen told Governor General Sir Reginald Wingate that everything would be done for the former president of the United States, but also pointed out that his troops had not even one donkey. In June 1910 the British Sudanese forces took over the Lado Enclave from the Belgians. The Anglican and Roman Catholic missionaries asked that Sunday be retained as a sabbath, as it had under the Belgians, rather than Friday as in the rest of the Sudan. Owen opposed retaining Sunday. He felt that the more "bigoted" Muslims in the army would object to working on Friday, and noted that all recruits to the army were instructed in the Muslim religion.

A few months later, however, Owen proposed creation of an Equatorial battalion composed entirely of southerners. This force would be taught to follow English commands and to follow Christian observances, forming the basis of a Christian population that would in time connect with that of Uganda and would prevent spread of the Muslim faith farther south. He was against the Muslim faith on the basis that it "may at any time break out into a wave of fanaticism". Owen's plan was approved by Wingate. On 7 December 1917 the last of the northern Sudanese troops were withdrawn from Mongalla, replaced by Equatorial troops.

Owen was part of the Beir Expedition in 1912 acting as a political officer and was involved in the Expeditionary Force, Lafit and Lokoia Mountains, Southern Sudan.

When Hasan Sharif, son of Khalifa Muhammad Sahif, was exiled to Mongalla in 1915 after taking part in a conspiracy in Ondurman, Governor Owen said "...I told him he is lucky to come and see this part of Sudan for nothing, when tourists pay hundreds of pounds ... I fear he doesn't see the joke...".

Owen's administration in Mongalla was ruthless, often using what his superiors considered to be excessive force. This may have stemmed in part from his military background, in part from the endemic violence of the South Sudan after two decades of colonial activity. After Owen had been governor for almost ten years, Wingate described him as "not of that mentality which is altogether desirable, especially in the more remote districts".

== Later career ==
Owen retired from his position as governor of Mongalla in 1918 and was given the sinecure position of governor of the Egyptian oases. Major Cecil Stephen Northcote succeeded him as Governor of Mongala.

Owen was appointed an Officer of the Order of the British Empire (OBE) in 1919. He was mentioned in dispatches twice, held the 3rd Class of the Order of the Medjidie and was a Grand Officer of the Order of the Nile. Owen died in Cairo on 1 August 1941.

== Bibliography ==
- Roger Carmichael Robert Owen, ed. (1908). Bari grammar and vocabulary. J. & E. Bumpus, ltd.
