= No. 1 African Survey Party =

- Active: December 1918 - November–December 1920
- Country: United Kingdom
- Type: Inactive
- Role: Survey Unit

The No. 1 African Survey Party was a Royal Air Force survey unit in charge of surveying the Cairo to Nimule section for the 1920 Cairo to Cape Town air route. It was dispatched in late December 1919 and cleared landing grounds, developed in conjunction with local colonial authorities. It had completed the Heliopolis to Khartoum section by January 1919, and works were fully done by December that year. The unit was disbanded in November–December 1920 after fulfilling its surveying and construction duties.

== History ==
Following Turkish surrender on 31 October 1918, GOC RAF Middle East, Major General William G. H. Salmond began planning the surveying and construction of landing grounds between Cairo and Cape Town. Apart from the landing ground at Khartoum, there were none south of Heliopolis. In late December 1918, the No. 1 African Survey Party was despatched to commence works on the Cairo to Nimule section of the route. Major Howard O. Long, whom was released after two years as POW, was appointed in charge of the unit. The party had six-eight officers and up to twenty other ranks. The unit undertook roughly a year of collecting all available information about its section. Following planning and with African labour, the unit was set off to clear aerodromes and landing grounds at intervals of about 200 miles or less. Works involved felling trees, clearing roots and levelling the ground afterwards.

The easiest sector was reported to be from Cairo to Lake Victoria. Along the Nile river, there was sufficient telegraph and railway connections, providing communications for the landing grounds. Entering the central region of Africa, much of the land was covered in dense bush and tropical forests. Further difficulties that the parties experienced included shortages of water, frequent infestations of mosquitos, and having to handle white ants. By January 1919, the route between Heliopolis and Khartoum had been completed in time for an inspection carried out by Brigadier General Philip L. W. Herbert by a Handley Page HP.0/400 that month. On 12 December 1919, Ian Cullen, A.F.C. was appointed as Flying Officer. On 21 April 1920, Lenneth F. Foxcroft-Jones was appointed as Flying Officer. The No. 1 African Survey Party's headquarters was established at Khartoum on 25 July 1919.

=== Disbandment ===
In December 1919, the work of developing the aerial route was complete. On 25 March 1920, the headquarters was disbanded, having fulfilled its duties in developing the Cairo to Cape Town aerial route. The unit was disbanded in November–December 1920.
