= Roy Gerard Corcor Brock =

Major Roy Gerard Corcor Brock OBE

Governor of Bahr al-Ghazal Province
- In office 1928–1934
- Succeeded by: P. Ingleson

Personal details
- Born: 22 February 1884
- Died: 1968 (aged 83–84)

Military service
- Branch/service: Royal West Kent Regiment

Major Roy Gerard Corcor Brock (22 February 1884 – 1968) was a British army officer and a colonial administrator in the Anglo-Egyptian Sudan who was appointed governor of Bahr el Ghazal Province.

== Early career ==
Brock was born on 22 February 1884. He was educated at Rugby College and the Royal Military College, Sandhurst. On 22 October 1902 he was commissioned a Second Lieutenant in the Royal West Kent Regiment. On 18 January 1912 Lieutenant Brock was seconded for service with the Egyptian army. With the outbreak of World War I, in July 1915 Brock was appointed a Staff Captain of Royal West Kent Regiment. He was appointed Major on 22 October 1917.

== Sudan administrator ==
Brock was seconded from the Egyptian army to the Political Service in 1918 and served as a District Commissioner in the Bahr-el-Ghazal and Mongalla Provinces. Brock was appointed Deputy governor of Mongalla Province. He estimated that he had added 50,000 Toposa and related people to the eastern half of this province in the 1920s, a somewhat inflated figure. Talking of the difficulty of running with Mongalla province with the extremely limited resources assigned by Khartoum, Brock said: 'Until we can properly administrate [sic], would it not be better not to attempt to do so at all?"

Brock became Governor of the Bahr-el-Ghazal Province in 1928. In 1930, Captain Harry F. Kidd reported from the west of the province that tribal organisation had broken down. He recommended removing Muslims such as the Gellaba, Fellata and Hausa from the district so that tribal organisations could be brought back. Brock accepted this assessment. He promoted the policy in Khartoum, arguing that it would reduce the risk of a rising in the north of Sudan spreading to the south, and that the tribal chiefs' courts would reduce costs.

Brock directed implementation of a drastic Southern Policy. His administration abolished the town of Kafia Kingi in Darfur and created what became called the Brock Line, a no man's land along the southern border of Darfur and Kordofan. Natives of these northern provinces were forbidden to enter Bahr al-Ghazal, other than Baggara pastoralists. He also decreed that the people of Bahr al-Ghazal should be moved from remote locations to a 265 miles (426 km) road from the provincial capital in Wau, South Sudan to Said Bandas on the western border, near to today's Boro Medina. The people would be grouped roughly by ethnicity. The government would undertake road works and improvement in health in an effort to kick-start modernisation.

On 22 May 1922 Brock was awarded the Order of the Nile, Fourth Class. On 10 June 1932 he was promoted to the Third Class of the Order of the Nile. Brock retired at the end of October 1934 after serving as governor of Bahr al-Ghazal for six years.

== Marriage ==
Brock married Dorothy Barbara daughter of Lt.-Col. James Meldrum Knox DSO in 1928 at Chelsea, London. She died aged 33 in 1939.

== Bibliography ==
- Major R. G. C. Brock (1918). "Some Notes on the Azande Tribe as Found in the Meridi District (Bahr El Ghazal Province)". Sudan Notes and Records. 1: 249–262.
