= Clarmont Skrine =

British civil servant and administrator

Sir Clarmont Percival Skrine OBE (1888–1974) was a British civil servant and administrator who served as the British consul-general in Kashgar from 1922 to 1924, Under-Secretary of State for India and agent for the Madras States from 1936 to 1939.

== Early life ==
Clarmont was born in Kensington, London, in the United Kingdom on 28 February 1888. He was the son of Francis Henry Bennett Skrine (1847−1933) of the Indian civil service and Helen Lucy née Stewart (1867–1954), and the grandson of the Revd Clarmont Skrine of Warleigh Lodge, Wimbledon. He was educated in England at Winchester College and New College, Oxford, and qualified for the Indian Civil Service in 1912.

== Career ==
Clarmont Skrine served in the Indian civil service from 1912 to 1915 and joined the Indian political service in 1915. From 1916 to 1919 he was British vice-consul in Kerman, Iran. From 1922 to 1924, he was posted in Kashgar, in Chinese Turkestan, as the British consul-general.

Clarmont married Doris Forbes née Whitelaw (1897–1971) on 23 November 1923 in Mumbai.

In 1925, he and his wife, he made a journey into the largely unknown valleys of the Kungar Alps in Chinese Turkestan, during which he mapped, photographed and surveyed the country. This journey was described in an article in 'The Times' in May 1925 and forms a central part of his book 'Chinese Central Asia'.

From 1926 to 1929 he was British consul in Seistan. On 20 November 1936, Skrine was appointed agent for the Madras States. Skrine served till 1 April 1937, when the agency was abolished and replaced with a residency. Clarmont also served as the first resident for the Madras States from 1 April 1937 to 15 January 1939. In January 1942 he traveled overland to Mashhad, Persia (near the Turkmen border) to become Consul General and remarkably took some film footage of his journey. British public records indicate he remained in post till the end of World War Two. From 1946 to 1948, Skrine served as Counsellor for Indian Affairs in Teheran, Persia.

== Later life ==
After his retirement from the service he was appointed by the firm Balfour Beatty & Co. to be Resident Director of the Jerusalem Electricity Corporation in connection with the scheme for obtaining electric power from the Jordan. Later he was chairman of the Permanent Committee on Geographical Names for Official Use and a partner in the firm of Mideast Guardians concerned with the placing of Iranian and other Middle Eastern children in British schools.

Skrine died in 1974 at the age of 86.

== Works ==
- Skrine, Clarmont Percival (1926). Chinese Central Asia. London, England: Methuen & Co Ltd.
- Skrine, Clarmont Percival (October 1931). "The Highlands of Persian Baluchistan". The Geographical Journal. 78 (4): 321–338. Bibcode:1931GeogJ..78..321S. doi:10.2307/1784749. JSTOR 1784749.
- Skrine, Clarmont Percival (1962). World War in Iran. London, England: Constable & Co Ltd. ISBN 978-0094519206.
- Skrine, Clarmont Percival; Nightingale, Pamela (1973). Macartney at Kashgar: new light on British, Chinese and Russian activities in Sinkiang, 1890-1918. London, England: Methuen. ISBN 978-0415361712.
- Skrine, Clarmont Percival. "Clarmont Skrine: Filmography". British Film Institute. Archived from the original on 17 March 2016.
