= No. 2 African Survey Party =

- Active: December 1918 - November–December 1920
- Country: United Kingdom
- Type: Inactive
- Role: Survey Unit

The No. 2 African Survey Party was a Royal Air Force survey unit in charge of surveying the Nimule to Abercorn section for the 1920 Cairo to Cape Town air route. It was dispatched in late December 1919 and cleared landing grounds, developed in conjunction with local colonial authorities. It had completed works by December that year. The unit was disbanded in November–December 1920 after fulfilling its surveying and construction duties.

== History ==
Following Turkish surrender on 31 October 1918, GOC RAF Middle East, Major General William G. H. Salmond began planning the surveying and construction of landing grounds between Cairo and Cape Town. Apart from the landing ground at Khartoum, there were none south of Heliopolis. Flight Lieutenant Edwin C. Emmett was appointed as officer in command of the unit. In late December 1918, the No. 2 African Survey Party was despatched to commence works on the Nimule to Abercorn section of the route. As Kituta was laden with mosquito-infested swamps, Abercorn was selected instead. The party had six-eight officers and up to twenty other ranks. The unit undertook roughly a year of collecting all available information about its section. Following planning and with African labour, the unit was set off to clear aerodromes and landing grounds at intervals of about 200 miles or less. Works involved felling trees, clearing roots and levelling the ground afterwards.

In the central region of Africa, much of the land was covered in dense bush and tropical forests. Further difficulties that the parties experienced included shortages of water, frequent infestations of mosquitos, and having to handle white ants. The No. 2 African Survey Party's headquarters was established at Nairobi on 25 July 1919.

=== Disbandment ===
In December 1919, the work of developing the aerial route was complete. On 25 March 1920, the headquarters was disbanded, having fulfilled its duties in developing the Cairo to Cape Town aerial route.
