= Francis Henry Skrine =

English traveller, orientalist and official in British India

Francis Henry Bennett Skrine (1847–1933) was an English traveller, orientalist and official in British India.

== Life ==
He was the son of the Rev. Clarmont Skrine of Warleigh Lodge, Wimbledon, previously an army officer, and his wife Mary Anne Auchmuty Bennett, daughter of Major Charles Butson Bennett. He was educated at Blackheath School and entered the Indian Civil Service in 1868.

In 1870 Skrine was appointed assistant magistrate and collector in Nadia district. He worked on famine relief in Bihar during 1874, and in Madras in 1877–8. He was officiating commissioner of Bhagalpur in 1893–4. He became collector of customs at Calcutta in 1895, and commissioner of Chittagong Division, retiring in 1897.

Subsequently Skrine travelled in Central Asia.

== Works ==
- Memorandum on the Material Condition of the Lower Orders in Bengal During the Ten Years from 1881–82 to 1891–92 (1892), an investigation covering the condition of agricultural workers. In 1891 Skrine had compiled a census report for Shahabad district.
- Laborious Days: Leaves from the Indian Record of Sir Charles Alfred Elliott (1892)
- An Indian Journalist: being the life, letters and correspondence of Dr. Sambhu C. Mookerjee, late editor of "Reis and rayyet" Calcutta (1895)
- The Life of Sir William Wilson Hunter, K.C.S.I (1901), on William Wilson Hunter, an authorised biography.
- The Heart of Asia: a History of Russian Turkestan and the Central Asian Khanates (1899) with Denison Ross Annette Meakin questioned some of the reporting of this book on Central Asian women.
- The Expansion of Russia, 1815–1900 (1904)
- Fontenoy and Great Britain's Share in the War of the Austrian Succession, 1741–48 (1906)
- Bahaism, the religion of brotherhood and its place in the evolution of creeds (1912)
- Gossip about Dr Johnson and Others being Characters from the Memoirs of Miss Laetitia Matilda Hawkins (1926), from Laetitia Matilda Hawkins.

== Family ==
Skrine married Helen Lucy Stewart, and was the father of Clarmont Percival Skrine.
