= Angus Cameron (colonial administrator) =

British colonial administrator (1871–1961)

Lieutenant Colonel Angus Cameron Bey

Governor of Mongalla Province
- In office January 1906 – January 1908
- Succeeded by: Cecil Stephen Northcote

Governor of Kassala Province
- In office January 1908 – July 1909

Governor of Sennar Province
- In office January 1913 – 5 September 1921

Personal details
- Born: 25 October 1871 Nairn
- Died: 7 January 1961 aged 89 Nairn

Military service
- Unit: Queen's Own Cameron Highlanders; Egyptian Army

Angus Cameron (1871–1961) was a British military officer and colonial administrator, the first governor of Mongalla Province in the south of the Anglo-Egyptian Sudan between 1906 and 1908 and later governor of Kassala and Sennar provinces.

== Early life ==
Cameron was born in Nairn on 25 October 1871. His father was James Angus Cameron, MD, BSc, DL. He attended school at Darlington, then in February 1891 went to the Royal Military College, Sandhurst, for a year. He gained a commission in the Queen's Own Cameron Highlanders on 18 May 1892, and was promoted Lieutenant in 1893 and Captain in 1896. In July 1899 Cameron was seconded to the Egyptian army, and as an officer of the IXth Sudanese he fought at the Battle of Gedid. In late November 1899 he was attached to the 9th Sudanese Battalion during the operations leading to the defeat of the Khalifa (mentioned in despatches 25 November 1899). He was appointed Senior Inspector of Sennar. Cameron remained in the Egyptian army service and that of the Sudan Government until he retired in 1921.

== Senior officer in Sudan ==
In January 1906 Cameron was appointed the first governor of Mongalla Province. Six members of the Gordon Memorial Sudan Mission arrived at Mongalla on the upper Nile in January 1906. Angus Cameron did his best to discourage them from settling in the province. He wanted to avoid friction with the Muslims who had undertaken most of the work of building and servicing the new provincial capital. Cameron suggested that the missionaries move to the Bor region instead.

In January 1908 Cameron became Governor of Kassala Province. He was appointed a Major in March 1909, and in July 1909 was seconded for service with the Sudan Government. In January 1913 he was appointed Governor of Sennar Province. He was described as "a rather peppery little Major".

Cameron served with the Egyptian Expeditionary Force in the Western Desert during World War I, and was promoted to Lieutenant-Colonel in June 1919. In December 1919, as governor of Sennar province, he granted a petition from six Ta'isha shaykhs to return to Darfur, from where they had moved during the reign of the Kalifa. Between December 1919 and April 1920 he was involved in operations to subdue the Garjak Nuer tribe in the Upper Nile. They had raided their neighbours, the Burun in December 1919.

== Later life ==
Cameron received the Order of the Medijidie, 3rd class, on 10 December 1907 and the Order of the Nile, second class, on 28 March 1919. He retired on 5 September 1921 and returned to Nairn. On 12 September 1923 he married Florence Muriel Allanby, who was born about 1883. When his father died in November 1924, Angus Cameron inherited the family house of Firhall He died on 7 January 1961 at the age of 89.
