= Chaplin Court Treatt =

English traveller and adventurer in Africa

- Born: 13 September 1888; Kensington, London
- Died: 11 July 1954 (aged 65); Los Angeles, California
- Spouse: Stella Court Treatt (m. 1923; div. 1935)
- Military career
- Allegiance: United Kingdom
- Branch: Royal Flying Corps
- Service years: 1915–1918
- Rank: Major

Major Chaplin Court Treatt (1888 – 1954), also known as "C.T.", was an English Royal Flying Corps officer and a traveller and adventurer in Africa who masterminded the Court Treatt Expedition 1924–1926, the first successful attempt to drive a motor car from Cape Town to Cairo.

== England ==
Chaplin Court Treat was born in Kensington, London on 13 September 1888, the son of London businessman Richard Court Treatt by his wife Florence, grew up in Elstead Mill, Elstead, Surrey, and attended Westminster School.

At the outset of the First World War he enlisted in the infantry with the Loyal North Lancashire Regiment and fought initially in France before transferring to the Royal Flying Corps in 1915. He flew missions as an observer until he was injured in a crash in 1916 which killed the pilot. After a period of recuperation he was sent to Egypt where he had a staff posting until the 1918 armistice.

== Africa ==
After the war, his first peacetime job, still as an RAF officer, was in Africa. Chaplin was employed with a survey team planning and mapping for the construction of airfields for the southern portion of the Trans-African air route. (Note: The southern section of the Imperial Airways trans-African route ran 2,000 miles from Mbala, Zambia (which was then called Abercorn, after the chairman of the British South Africa Company, which ran the town in those days) through Kabwe (then called Broken Hill) and then along the railway linking Kabwe to Cape Town. Kabwe is now located in Zambia, formerly named Northern Rhodesia after Cecil Rhodes, founder of the British South Africa Company.) The project was finished in 1922 and Chaplin chose to remain in Africa.

In 1923, Chaplin married Stella Hinds in South Africa. In 1924, after an interval securing permissions in England, Chaplin and Stella, together with Stella's brother, Errol Hinds, and several others, undertook a seventeen-month car journey from Cape Town to Cairo.

== Later life ==
The Court Treatts divorced in London in 1935. Chaplin mounted several further African expeditions before moving to the United States. He died in Los Angeles on 11 July 1954.

== See also ==
- Court Treatt expedition
