= Cecil Stephen Northcote =

Major Cecil Stephen Northcote CBE

Governor of Mongalla Province
- In office 1918 – February 1919
- Preceded by: Roger Carmichael Robert Owen
- Succeeded by: Chauncey Hugh Stigand

Governor of Nuba Mountains Province
- In office 16 March 1919 – 7 March 1928
- Preceded by: R.S. Wilson
- Succeeded by: James Angus Gillan

Personal details
- Born: 1878
- Died: 1945 (aged 66–67)

Major Cecil Stephen Northcote CBE (1878–1945) was a British military officer who was the governor of Mongalla Province in the Anglo-Egyptian Sudan from 1918 to 1919, and then of the Nuba Mountains province from 1919 to 1927.

Northcote served in the Cape Mounted Rifles as a private during the Second Boer War, and was commissioned as a second lieutenant in the Bedfordshire Regiment in 1902. Northcote joined the Egyptian army in April 1909. He was seconded to the Sudan Political Service in February 1912, and was posted to Bahr al-Ghazal. For his time in the Sudan during the First World War, he was mentioned in despatches.

Northcote was appointed Governor of Mongalla from 1918 until 1919. When he took office in Mongalla he was advised by his predecessor, R.C.R. Owen, to exclude all northern merchants from the province. Owen explained that "if a Jihad is ever started in the Sudan and Northern Africa, it would be a great thing if the countries south of the Sudd were free from it and if we could link up with Uganda which is practically entirely Christian and so have an anti-Islam buffer or bulwark in this part of Africa".

When Northcote was appointed governor in 1918, the fifteen provincial governorships in the Sudan under Governor General Reginald Wingate were held by eight army officers, or former officers, and severn civilians. By 1924, when Wingate's successor Sir Lee Stack died, Northcote and M.J. Wheatley in Bahr al-Ghazal were the only governors with military backgrounds. Northcote was transferred to the Nuba Mountains in 1919, and was succeeded in Mongalla by Chauncey Hugh Stigand. He was governor of the Nuba mountains province until he retired in 1928. His successor was Mr. J.A. Gillan. He was appointed a Commander of the Order of the British Empire (CBE) in the 1928 Birthday Honours.
