= James Tor Monybuny =

South Sudanese politician

Deputy Governor of Upper Nile State
- Incumbent
- Assumed office 29 January 2021

Governor of Central Upper Nile State
- In office 14 January 2017 – 20 May 2019
- Preceded by: office created
- Succeeded by: Peter Chol Wal

James Tor Monybuny is a South Sudanese politician who has been the deputy governor of Upper Nile State since January 2021, and was the first governor of Central Upper Nile State from 2017-2019. Monybuny is from Baliet, and is a member of the Ngok Lual Yak section of the Padang Dinka. Earlier in his career, Monybuny was a pastor for the Presbyterian Church in South Sudan and the Baliet County commissioner.

== Governor of Central Upper Nile State ==
After the creation of Central Upper Nile State from Eastern Nile State on January 14, 2017, Monybuny became governor, due in part to ties with Vice President Taban Deng Gai. On January 28, 2018, Shilluk youth protesters blocked Monybuny's from entering the PoC camp in Malakal. Monybuny, along with three other governors, was removed from office by Salva Kiir on May 20, 2019. Kiir said the governors were not present in their states. Monybuny was replaced as governor of Central Upper Nile State by Peter Chol Wal.

== Deputy Governor of Upper Nile State ==
While governors for nine of South Sudan's ten states had been appointed in the summer of 2020, the governor and deputy governor positions for Upper Nile State remained unfilled due to a dispute over the nomination of Johnson Olonyi as governor. When Budhok Ayang Kur was appointed governor in January 2021, Monybuny was appointed deputy governor by the government in order to appease the Padang Dinka, even though the position was supposed to be appointed by the South Sudan Opposition Alliance.
