= Fangak County =

- County
- Location in South Sudan
- Coordinates: 9.06944°N 30.88417°E
- Country: South Sudan
- Region: Greater Upper Nile
- State: Jonglei State
- Headquarters: Phom el Zaraf

Government
  - County Commissioner: James Maluit Ruei

Population (2008)
  - Total: 110,130
- Time zone: UTC+2 (CAT)

Fangak County is an administrative area of Jonglei State in the Greater Upper Nile region of South Sudan, with headquarters in the town of Phom el Zaraf.

== Location ==
The county is located between Koch County in Unity State in the South-West, Guit County in Unity State to the west, Ayod County to the south, Pigi County to the east, Panykang County of Upper Nile State in the northeast, and Panriang County in the north. Phom el Zaraf town, the county headquarters, lies where the Bahr el Zeraf enters the White Nile from the east. The Zeraf island, in which the town of Old Fangak is located, comprises a large part of the county. The island, much of which is within the Block 5A oilfield, is between the White Nile, or Bahr el Jebel, to the west and the Bahr el Zeraf to the east.

== People ==
The 2008 census estimated that the population of the county was 110,130. Most of the inhabitants of Fangak County belong to the Laak and Thiang sections of the Nuer people. The people are agro-pastoralist, growing crops for personal use and for sale by traditional agricultural techniques and raising cattle. Cattle are central to the culture, exchanged in marriages, and provide milk, meat and hides.

== Security issues ==
In February 2011, forces loyal to the rebel General George Athor attacked three operational outposts of the Sudan People's Liberation Army (SPLA). They briefly occupied the town of Fangak before withdrawing when SPLA troops arrived. Several people died in the conflict. Later the SPLA reported that at least 105 people had been killed, mostly women and children. UN Secretary-General Ban Ki-moon, called for immediate implementation of the January ceasefire agreement. In June 2011 James Maluit Ruach, Commissioner of Fangak County, said that the security situation was under control but that Athor's forces had sown land mines, which urgently needed to be cleared.
