= List of current state governors in South Sudan =

The following is a list of governors and chief administrators of the states and administrative areas of South Sudan.

== 10 states and three areas (2020–present) ==
=== Governors of states ===
State	Headquarters	Governor	Party	Deputy Governor	Party
Central Equatoria	Juba	Emmanuel Adil Anthony	SPLM	Sarah Neni Ridento	OPP
Eastern Equatoria	Torit	Louis Lobong Lojore	SPLM	Mary Nadio Lodira Alphonse	SPLM-IO
Jonglei	Bor	Riek Gai Kok	SSOA	Antipas Nyok Kucha	SPLM
Lakes State	Rumbek	Madhang Majok Meen	SPLM	Ustaz Poth Madit Dut	SPLM-IO
Northern Bahr el Ghazal	Aweil	Charles Madut Akol	SPLM	Tong Lual Ayat	OPP
Unity State	Bentiu	Joseph Nguen Monytuil Wejang	SPLM	Tor Tungwar Kueiguong	SPLM-IO
Upper Nile	Malakal	James Koang Chuol	SPLM-IO	James Tor Monybuny	
Warrap	Kuajok	Am Bol Wek Agoth	SPLM	Aluel Garang Garang	OPP
Western Bahr el Ghazal	Wau	Sherif Daniel Sherif	SPLM	Angelo Taban Baijo	SPLM
Western Equatoria	Yambio	Badagbu Daniel Rimbasa	SPLM-IO	Justin Joseph Marona	SPLM

=== Chief Administrators of administrative areas ===
State	Headquarters	Chief Administrator	Party
Abyei Area	Abyei Town	Charles Abyei	SPLM
Pibor Area	Pibor	Gola Boyoi	SPLM
Ruweng Area	Pariang	Tiop Manyluak De Diran	SPLM

== 32 states (2017–2020) ==
State	Headquarters	Name	Counties	Total number of counties
Amadi	Mundri	Joseph Ngere Pachiko	3	
Aweil	Aweil	Jaldit Malith Jal	8	
Aweil East	Wanyjok	Deng Deng Akuei	13	
Boma	Pibor	David Yau Yau	3	
Bieh	Waat	Moses Majok Gatluak	2	
Eastern Lakes	Yirol	Mangar Buong Aluenge	15	
Central Upper Nile	Malakal	Deng Akuei	4	
Gbudwe	Yambio	Daniel Badagbu Rempos	6	
Gogrial	Kuacjok	Victor Atem Atem	13	
Gok	Cueibet	Madang Majok Meen	9	
Torit	Torit	Nartisio Loluke Manir	12	
Jonglei	Bor	Maker Thiong Mal	14	
Jubek	Juba	Augustino Jadalla Wani	13	
Latjoor	Nasir	Gen. Gathoth Gatkuoth	2	
Lol	Raja	Rizik Zachariah Hassan	11	
Maridi	Maridi	Africano Mande	7	
Kapoeta	Kapoeta	Louise Lobong Lojore	8	
Northern Liech	Bentiu	Joseph Monytuil	11	
Ruweng	Pariang	Them Machar Kuol	2	
Southern Liech	Leer	Teker Riek Dong	9	
Terekeka	Terekeka	Chan Ali Malou	5	
Tonj	Tonj	Matthew Mathiang Magordit	19	
Twic	Mayenabun	Sultan Madhel Lang Juuk	6	
Wau	Wau	Angelo Taban Biajo	9	
Fangak	Ayod	John Kong Nyuon	3	
Western Lakes	Rumbek	Mahmoud Solomon	11	
Fashoda	Kodok	Al Taib Okony Ajang	3	
Yei River	Yei	Emmanuel Adil Anthony	10	
Tombura	Tombura	Patrick Raphael Zamoi	4	
Akobo	Akobo	Johnson Gony Beliu	1	
Maiwut	Maiwut	Bol Ruach Rom	6	
Northern Upper Nile	Renk	Thon Bany	7	

== See also ==
- List of current state governors in Sudan
- List of Centrafrican prefectures prefects (in French)
