= Eastern Nile State =

State of South Sudan from 2015 to 2017

Eastern Nile
- Former State
- Location of Eastern Nile in South Sudan
- Country: South Sudan
- Capital: Malakal
- Number of Counties: 7

Population (2014 Estimate)
  - Total: 746,710

Eastern Nile was a state in South Sudan that existed between 2 October 2015 and 14 January 2017 when it was divided into Central Upper Nile State and Northern Upper Nile State. It was located in the Greater Upper Nile region and it was part of the former states of Upper Nile and Jonglei. The state bordered the states of Eastern Bieh, Latjoor, Western Bieh, Fashoda State, and the country of Ethiopia to the east.

== History ==
Before Eastern Nile State was formed, its territory was in the former states of Upper Nile and Jonglei. On 2 October 2015, President Salva Kiir issued a decree establishing 28 states in place of the 10 constitutionally established states. The decree established the new states largely along ethnic lines. A number of opposition parties and civil society groups challenged the constitutionality of the decree. Kiir later resolved to take it to parliament for approval as a constitutional amendment. In November the South Sudanese parliament empowered President Kiir to create new states. Chol Thon Balook was appointed Governor on 24 December 2015. On 14 January 2017 Eastern Nile State was divided into Central Upper Nile State and Northern Upper Nile State.

== Geography ==
Eastern Nile State was located in the Greater Upper Nile region and the state borders the states of Latjoor and Eastern Bieh to the south, Western Bieh and Western Nile to the west, and the country of Ethiopia to the east.

=== Administrative divisions ===
When Eastern Nile State was formed, the state split even further into a total of 11 counties. These counties are Malakal County, Renk County, Melut County, Sobat West County, Sobat East County, Akoka County, Koma County, Atar County, Khor Fulus County, Northeast Maban County, and Southeast Maban County. Each county was also given a county commissioner.

=== Towns and cities ===
The capital of the state was Malakal. Malakal's population in 2015 was 160,765. Malakal is the 2nd largest in the country. Other towns and villages in the state of Eastern Nile include Daga Post, Doleib Hill, Melut (located in Melut County), and Renk (located in Renk County).
