= Kwoinlo =

- Location in South Sudan
- Coordinates: 9°10′0″N 30°46′8″E
- Country: South Sudan
- Region: Greater Upper Nile
- State: Jonglei State
- County: Fangak County
- Time zone: UTC+2 (CAT)

Kwoinlo is a small village in the Fangak County of Jonglei State, in the Greater Upper Nile region of South Sudan. It lies northwest of Fangak.
