= Upper Nile =

Upper Nile may refer to:

- Upper portion of the river Nile and its surrounding areas.
- Greater Upper Nile, a region of South Sudan
- Upper Nile (state), a state of South Sudan
