= Abudhok Ayang Kur =

South Sudanese politician

Abudhok Ayang Kur is a South Sudanese politician and the former governor of Upper Nile. Ayang is a Shilluk. In 2015, Ayang was appointed as the deputy governor of the Fashoda State His swearing in, witnessed shooting and killing of civilians who came out of POC upon his arrival to Malakal.
