= Nyal, South Sudan =

Town in Panyijar County, Unity State, South Sudan

Coordinates: 7°45′N 30°16′E

Nyal Town (or Nyal) is located in the Panyijar County of Unity State, in the Greater Upper Nile region of South Sudan. The town is known for the effects of extended fighting from the South Sudanese Civil War, leading to exceptionally poor humanitarian conditions including destruction of infrastructure, forced displacement, starvation, and sexual violence.

Nyal acted as a security centre as many people came from different corners of Unity State and Eastern Upper Nile to live. It has accommodated thousands of internally displaced persons (IDPs) during the South Sudanese Civil War. Historically, Nyal Town is known for its power to resist external attacks from enemies during the colonial era, Nuer-British War of 1923-1933, Second Sudanese and the first South Sudanese Civil War of 2013-2019.

== Geography ==
Nyal is known for its mango and palm trees. Nyal has a rainy and a dry season. The rainy season typically begins in April, making roads and the local landing strip inaccessible.

== Recent history ==
Nyal residents do not travel to the capital, Juba, by road, due to the presence of government forces, and hence must depend on aid organizations for food and medical supplies. The town has taken in civilians who have been displaced by fighting in Unity State. According to a March 2016 report, the most recent World Food Programme distribution of food in Nyal took place in September, 2015. Cigarettes and batteries could be purchased in the Nyal market, but as of February 2016, food was not visible on market shelves. It was reported that Nyal residents were standing in line in hot sun to register with the World Food Programme, and the German organization "Welthungerhilfe," to receive food, at such time as food might become available.

Local health concerns include malaria, diarrhea, typhoid, and bilharzia. Nyal Town provides limited medical services as of 2015. The main clinic is run by Sign of Hope. A mobile clinic operates in the market, staffed by UNIDO. A smaller clinic is located about 6–8 hours east, in Maluak. For people living in the swamps north of town, only local herbal medicines may be available, such as preparations made from the Nim tree.

An IRIN report said that a flight over Nyal in March 2014 revealed that half or more of Nyal's homes had been "burned to the ground." Also in March 2014, a Director of Food and Agriculture Organization's Emergency and Rehabilitation Division visited an island in the swamps north of Nyal which hosted 2,000 internally displaced persons, commenting, "It wasn’t until we spoke to them that we began to understand the true magnitude of their despair." He went on to state,

They have nothing – no possessions, just one another. When we met the family, they were sitting under a tree in the middle of nowhere – this is where they live today. There is no shelter, no mosquito netting, no sanitation and water comes from the surrounding swamps. Above all, there is no food at all.

In August 2014, markets, schools, and health facilities in villages surrounding Nyal Town were closed. Residents were preparing flour from water lilies, which had little nutritional value, and the International Rescue Committee expressed concern about the possibility of famine.

Nyal Town and surrounding areas were further impacted by the Sudan People’s Liberation Army (SPLA) Spring 2015 offensive, as persons displaced by the offensive fled to Nyal and its surrounding areas. Displaced persons who were unable to travel by boats or canoe arrived on foot, with their possessions wrapped up in plastic sheets, and dragging their bundles behind them with a rope. Foot travel was considered cheaper, but more dangerous, due to poisonous snakes and crocodiles in the swamps. Much of Nyal Town remained deserted "for weeks" after the fighting ended. Burned huts were empty, and fallen soldiers of pro-government forces remained unburied.

As of October 2015, the town was occupied by rebel fighters opposing the government of President Salva Kiir. At that time, a report said that the FAO was flying relief supplies into Nyal, using Ilyushin jets. In early December 2015, an area commissioner for SPLM-IO said that the humanitarian conditions in Nyal were "horrific," and that civilians fleeing fighting in other counties were arriving in Nyal payam. He called for help from the international community to save the lives of the women and children.

As of December 2015, Relief Web stated that the number of displaced persons in the Nyal area was 6,000 to 10,000 people. Between 2,500 and 3,500 people were living on islands in the swamps north of Nyal, mostly women and children, including many unaccompanied children. There were few "humanitarian actors" in the area. According to this report, most residents and that IDPs in the islands stated they were not receiving supplies from relief organizations.

A March 2016 report estimates that over 50,000 people have now arrived in Nyal to escape the two years of fighting, in which scorched-earth tactics, atrocities, and sexual violence were used against civilian population. A Human Rights Watch spokesperson states that "massive rape, forced marriage, and abduction of women and girls" has occurred, and believes that "the scale of sexual violence in Unity State since mid-2015 has been shocking and may be unprecedented."

As of April 2016, coverage of Nyal Town has been lacking in mainstream news sources. One freelance journalist reports being told that there was "no news hook.” She found that women in Nyal were willing to talk to her about rape, but would not discuss it with the local men. In general, the adults she met in Nyal were reacting to trauma by being somewhat dazed. They were also very hungry. By contrast, children continued to laugh and play.

On May 21, 2016, there was once again heavy fighting in Nyal, between SPLA-IO opposition forces and forces loyal to President Salva Kiir (SPLA-JUBA).

== Sport ==
=== Nyal Football League ===
Nyal Football League was previously having eight football clubs. It was formed in 2000s . Here is the list of clubs according their highest ranking in the competition.

1: Niang FC

This club has Many stars than others in football competition so they took a lot of titles in Greater Nyal or Payinjiar at large. They took 5 major recognized trophies unlike their mostly rival Nyabang Fc ( well known as Morning Stars). Niang FC are situated in Greater Nyal ( They are town club)

2: Nyabang FC (Best known as Morning Stars) They are always unlucky in the competition. They used to be the best runners in Greater Nyal Football League. Their Stadium is situated in Duong Town.

== See also ==
- Refugees of South Sudan
- South Sudanese Civil War
