= Faddoi =

Village in Eastern Bieh, South Sudan

- Location in South Sudan
- Coordinates: 8°7′N 32°17′E
- Country: South Sudan
- State: Eastern Bieh
- County: Akobo County
- Time zone: UTC+3 (EAT)

Faddoi is a village in South Sudan. It is located in Akobo County, Eastern Bieh, in the northeastern part of South Sudan, near the International border with Ethiopia. Before reorganisation of new states in 2015, it was a part of Jonglei. It is connected by road from Akobo from the southeast and Waat just to the northwest. The Ez Zeraf Game Reserve lies to the west. A landing ground was once considered in Faddoi.
