= Fashoda County =

Fashoda
- County
- Country: South Sudan
- Region: Greater Upper Nile
- State: Upper Nile State

Area
  - Total: 3,582 km^{2} (1,383 sq mi)

Population (2017 estimate)
  - Total: 52,648
  - Density: 14.70/km^{2} (38.07/sq mi)
- Time zone: UTC+2 (CAT)

Fashoda County is an administrative area in Upper Nile State, in the Greater Upper Nile region of South Sudan.

When Fashoda State was created in 2015 (along with Manyo County, before later subsequently creating more counties until its dissolution in 2020), it was also known as Kodok County.
