= Koma County =

- Country: South Sudan
- State: Maiwut State
  - Summer (DST): +3GMT

Koma County is an administrative area in Maiwut State, South Sudan.
