= Gwor County =

- Country: South Sudan
- State: Terekeka
  - Summer (DST): +3GMT

Gwor County is an administrative area in Terekeka State, South Sudan.
