= Tigor County =

- Country: South Sudan
- State: Terekeka State
  - Summer (DST): +3GMT

Tigor County is an administrative area in Terekeka State, South Sudan.
