= Tali County =

- Country: South Sudan
- State: Terekeka State
  - Summer (DST): +3GMT

Tali County is an administrative area in Terekeka State, South Sudan.
