= Panyijar County =

Panyijar County NYUONG
- County
- Nickname: Gaatdool
- Motto: Strength with diversity
- Country: South Sudan
- Region: Greater Upper Nile
- State: Unity State

Government
  - Type: Town council
  - Commissionership: Stephen Gai Riak Gaak

Area
  - Total: 2,060 sq mi (5,340 km^{2})

Population (2017 estimate)
  - Total: 83,433
  - Density: 40.5/sq mi (15.6/km^{2})
- Time zone: UTC+2 (CAT)

Panyijar County is an administrative division of Unity State in the Greater Upper Nile region of South Sudan.

Panyijar County was "once a thriving agricultural area before decades of war forced inhabitants to migrate elsewhere."

"The United Nations says that up to 40,000 people are displaced to islands in the Bahr el Jebel River and surrounding wetlands in Unity State’s Panyijar County. Payinjiar County is the southernmost in Unity State and was the last place of refuge for thousands of people who fled southward during government offensives into Unity State from the northwest in January and February. The Nyuongland becomes a safe place until the R-ARCSS signed on September 12 2018. The county was also attacked by government Forces and backed cattle raiders from neighboring Lakes State. At the county headquarters about half of the houses have been burned down, as well as villages elsewhere."

The county experienced heavy fighting in 2015 between "South Sudanese opposition forces (SPLA-IO) (Note: Sudanese Peoples Liberation Army-In Opposition) and forces loyal to Salva Kiir (SPLA-IG)" (Note: Sudanese Peoples Liberation Army-In Government)

As of March, 2016 malnutrition among the county's children "far exceeded international emergency thresholds." One technical assessment expert for Action Against Hunger and the South Sudan Nutrition Information Working Group, reporting that “In my entire career, I have never seen such an alarmingly high prevalence of Global Acute Malnutrition anywhere ... The data clearly indicates that in Panyijar, the emergency is quite severe.”
