= Nyaruac Kolang =

- Born: 1900
- Died: 1973 (aged 72–73)
- Citizenship: Sudan
- Occupation: Prophetess
- Father: Kolang Ket

Nyaruac Kolang (died 1973) was a Nuer prophetess.

== Life ==
Nyaruac Ket (Nyaruac means 'Daughter of Speech') was the daughter of Koland Ket, a Nuer chief who claimed to be a prophet seized by the divinity 'Maani'. Entangled in warfare with the Dinka, Koland Ket was imprisoned by government authorities and died in custody in 1925. Nyaruac Kolang – at the time a married woman without children – left her husband to look after her father. After his death she announced that she had inherited his spiritual powers. Although this succession was disputed, her rival was killed in battle with government troops in the same year.

On taking up her role as prophet, Nyaruac Ket announced "I will not go to raid people". Her avoidance of war, and perhaps her status as a woman, allowed her to continue as a Nuer religious leader without attracting persecution by colonial authorities. Like other prophets, she made sacrifices against cattle diseases and human epidemics, and she was believed to cure infertility in other women.

She survived the First Sudanese Civil War, and died in 1973 at Lingpuot, Western Upper Nile.
