= States of South Sudan =

- Category: Federated state
- Location: South Sudan
- Number: 10 states 2 administrative areas 1 area with special administrative status
- Government: State government
- Subdivisions: County

The States of South Sudan were created out of the three historic former provinces (and contemporary regions) of Bahr el Ghazal (northwest), Equatoria (southern), and Greater Upper Nile (northeast). The states are further divided into 79 counties.

In October 2015, South Sudan's President Salva Kiir issued a decree establishing 28 states in place of the 10 that was previously established. The decree established the new states largely along ethnic lines. A number of opposition parties challenged the constitutionality of this decree and the decree was referred to parliament for approval as a constitutional amendment. In November, the South Sudanese parliament approved the creation of the new states. In January 2017, President Salva Kiir stated a decreed of further subdivision of the country from 28 into 32 states.

In February 2020, as a result of a peace agreement that ended the South Sudanese Civil War, the country returned to the original 10 states plus two administrative areas, Greater Pibor and Ruweng, and the special administrative status area of Abyei.

As a result of the Comprehensive Peace Agreement signed in 2005, the Abyei Area is considered to be simultaneously part of the Republic of Sudan and the Republic of South Sudan, effectively a condominium. The Kafia Kingi area is disputed between South Sudan and Sudan and the Ilemi Triangle is disputed between South Sudan and Kenya.

== Ten states and three areas (2020–present) ==
The administrative subdivisions of South Sudan grouped in the three historical provinces of: Bahr el Ghazal Equatoria Greater Upper Nile

Under the terms of a peace agreement signed on 22 February 2020, South Sudan is divided into ten states, two administrative areas and one area with special administrative status. The states and administrative areas are grouped into the three historical regions of the Sudan: Bahr el Ghazal, Equatoria, Greater Upper Nile. Each state is headed by a Governor and administrative areas are led by Chief Administrators.

Flag	State or area	Capital	Governor or Chief Administrator	Population (2010)	Area (km^{2})	Density (/km^{2})	Region
	Northern Bahr el Ghazal	Aweil	Simon Uber Mawut	820,834	30,543	26.87	Bahr el Ghazal
	Western Bahr el Ghazal	Wau	Emmanuel Okello	358,692	91,076	3.94	Bahr el Ghazal
	Lakes	Rumbek	Rin Tueny Mabor	782,504	43,595	17.95	Bahr el Ghazal
	Warrap	Kuajok	Magok Magok Deng	1,044,217	45,567	22.92	Bahr el Ghazal
	Western Equatoria	Yambio	Alfred Futiyo Karaba	658,863	79,343	8.30	Equatoria
	Central Equatoria	Juba	Emmanuel Adil Anthony	1,193,130	43,033	27.73	Equatoria
	Eastern Equatoria	Torit	Louis Lobong Lojore	962,719	73,472	13.10	Equatoria
	Jonglei	Bor	Riek Gai Kok	1,228,824	80,926	15.18	Greater Upper Nile
	Unity	Bentiu	Riek Tap Long	399,105	37,836	22.79	Greater Upper Nile
	Upper Nile	Malakal	Budhok Ayang Kur	1,013,629	77,283	13.12	Greater Upper Nile
	Abyei Area	Abyei	Charles Abyei Jok	124,390	10,546	11.79	Bahr el Ghazal
	Greater Pibor Area	Pibor	Lokali Amae Bullen	214,676	41,962	5.12	Greater Upper Nile
	Ruweng Area	Pariang	Stefano Wieu Mialek	246,360	TBD	TBD	Greater Upper Nile

== 32 states (2017–2020) ==
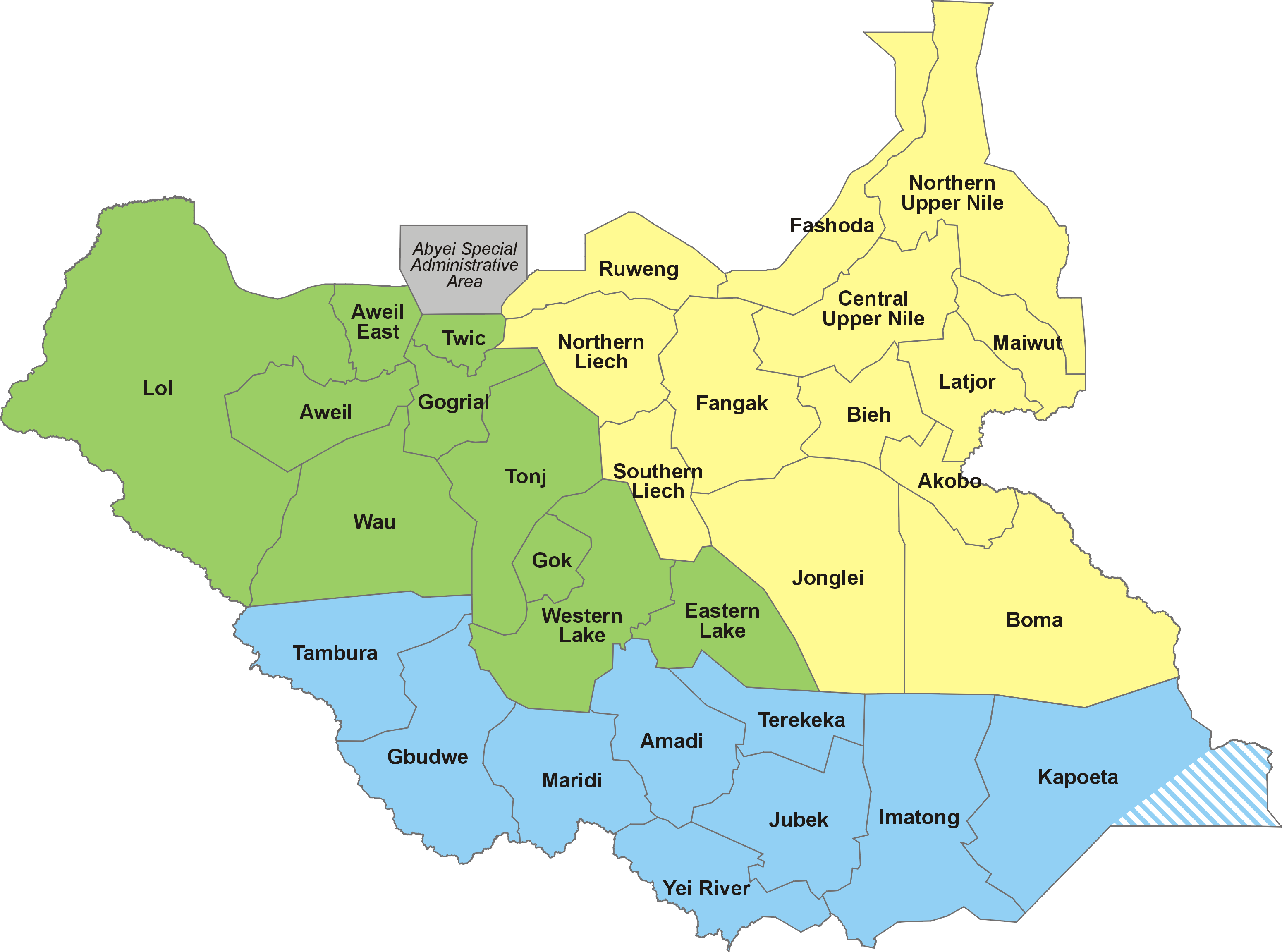
The 32 states of South Sudan grouped in the three historical provinces of the Sudan Bahr el Ghazal Equatoria Greater Upper Nile

On 14 January 2017, President Kiir issued a presidential decree that increased the number of federal states from 28 to 32.

- The now defunct Eastern Nile State was split into 2 individual states, Central Upper Nile State with Malakal as its capital city and Northern Upper Nile State with Renk as its capital city.
- Akobo State was formed and split from Bieh State, with Akobo as its capital. It comprises Akobo county in the Greater Upper Nile Region.
- Maiwut State was formed and split from Latjoor State in the Greater Upper Nile Region retaining Koma, Longuchuk, and Maiwut counties.
- Tambura State was formed and split from Gbudwe State, with Tambura as its capital. It comprises Tambura and Nagero counties in the Equatoria Region.

=== List ===
The 32 states were as follows:

State	Counties	Capital	Last Governor	Appt. to Office Date	Refs	Former State
Greater Upper Nile Region (13 States)
Akobo State	Akobo	Akobo	Johnson Gony Bilieu			Jonglei
Bieh State	Uror; Nyirol	Waat	Moses Majiok Gatluak			Jonglei
Boma State	Pochalla; Pibor	Pibor	Sultan Ismail Konyi			Jonglei
Fangak State	Ayod; Fangak	Ayod	James Kok Ruea			Jonglei
Jonglei State	Bor South; Twic East; Duk	Bor	Philip Agwer Panyang			Jonglei
Northern Liech State	Mayom; Koch; Rubkona; Guit	Bentiu	Joseph Nguen Monytuil			Unity
Ruweng State	Panriang; Abiemnhom	Panriang	Thiaji de-Dut Deng			Unity
Southern Liech State	Mayendit; Leer; Panyijiar	Leer	Teker Riek Dong			Unity
Central Upper Nile State	Akoka (Note: County created since after the independence of South Sudan in 2011.); Pigi; Baliet; Malakal; Panyikang (Note: Only the eastern portion of the county was part of Central Upper Nile State, as the western portion was part of Fashoda State.)	Malakal	James Tor Monybuny			Upper Nile
Fashoda State	Kodok; Manyo; Panyikang (Note: Only the western portion of the county was part of Fashoda State, as the eastern portion was part of Central Upper Nile State.)	Kodok	Johnson Olony			Upper Nile
Latjor State	Ulang; Nasir	Nasir	Peter Gatkuoth Khor			Upper Nile
Maiwut State	Longchuk; Koma; Maiwut	Maiwut	Bol Ruach Rom			Upper Nile
Northern Upper Nile State	Renk; Maban; Melut	Renk	Deng Akoi Gak			Upper Nile
Bahr El Ghazal Region (10 States)
Eastern Lakes State	Yirol East; Yirol West; Awerial	Yirol	Ring Tueny Mabor		Ring Tueny Mabor	Lakes
Gok State	Cueibet	Cueibet	Madang Majok Meen		Madang Majok Meen	Lakes
Western Lakes State	Rumbek North; Rumbek East; Rumbek Center; Wulu	Rumbek	Abraham Makoi Bol		Abraham Makoi Bol	Lakes
Aweil East State	Aweil East	Wanjok	Deng Deng Akuei		Deng Deng Akuei	North Bahr el Ghazal
Aweil State	Aweil South; Aweil Center	Aweil	Ronald Ruai Deng		Ronald Ruai Deng	North Bahr el Ghazal
Gogrial State	Gogrial West; Gogrial East	Kuacjok	Abraham Gum Makuach		Gregory Deng Kuach Aduol	Warrap
Tonj State	Tonj North; Tonj East; Tonj South	Tonj	Akech Tong Aleu		Akech Tong Aleu	Warrap
Twic State	Twic	Mayen-Abun	Bona Pariek Biar		Kon Manyiel Kuol	Warrap
Lol State	Raja; Aweil North; Aweil West	Raja	Rizik Zachariah Hassan		Rizik Zachariah Hassan	West Bahr el Ghazal
Wau State	Jur River; Bagari	Wau	Elias Waya Nyipouch		Andrea Mayar Achor	West Bahr el Ghazal
Equatoria Region (9 States)
Jubek State	Juba (Note: Also includes Bari, Lokoya and Nyangwara communities.)	Juba	Augustino Jadalla Wani		Augustino Jadalla Wani	Central Equatoria
Terekeka State	Terekeka; Jemeiza; Gwor; Tali; Tigor	Terekeka	Juma Ali Malou		Juma Ali Malou	Central Equatoria
Yei River State	Yei; Lainya; Morobo; Kajo Keji	Yei	David Lokonga Moses		David Lokonga Moses	Central Equatoria
Imatong State	Lopa; Torit; Ikotos; Magwi	Torit	Natisio Loluke Manir		Natisio Loluke Manir	East Equatoria
Kapoeta State	Kapoeta North; Kapoeta East; Kapoeta South; Budi	Kapoeta	Louise Lobong Lojore		Louise Lobong Lojore	East Equatoria
Amadi State	Mvolo; Mundri West; Mundri East	Mundri	Joseph Pachiko		Joseph Pachiko	West Equatoria
Gbudwe State	Yambio; Ezo; Anzara	Yambio	Patrick Raphael Zamoi		Badagu Daniel Remposa	West Equatoria
Maridi State	Maridi; Ibba	Maridi	Africano Monday		Africano Monday	West Equatoria
Tambura State	Tambura; Nagero	Tambura	Patrick Raphael Zamoi		Patrick Raphael Zamoi	West Equatoria

== 28 states (2015–2017) ==
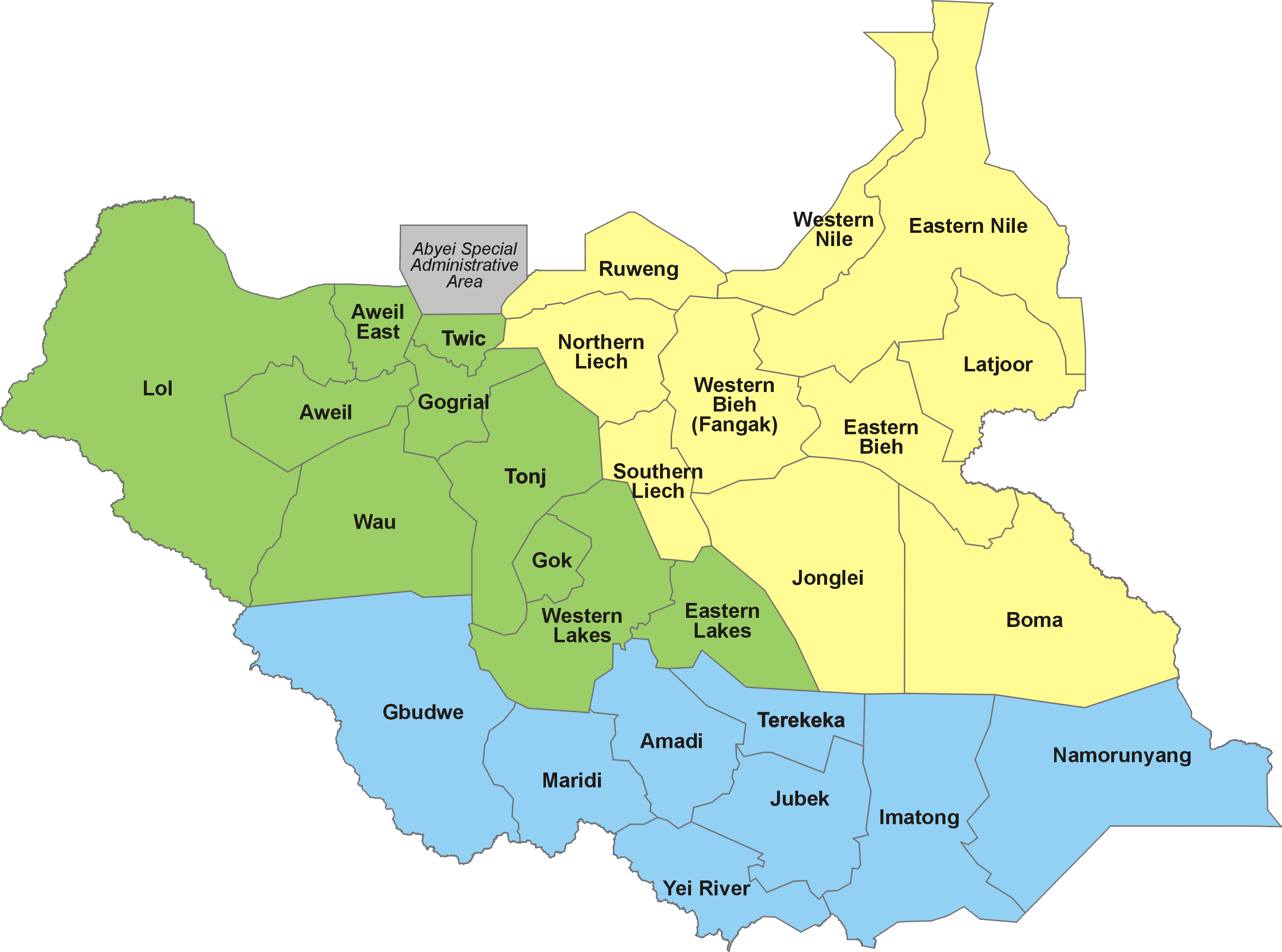
The 28 states of South Sudan grouped in the three historical provinces of the Sudan Bahr el Ghazal Equatoria Greater Upper Nile

=== Bahr el Ghazal ===
1. Aweil
2. Aweil East
3. Eastern Lakes
4. Gogrial
5. Gok
6. Lol
7. Tonj
8. Twic
9. Wau
10. Western Lakes

=== Equatoria ===
1. Amadi
2. Gbudwe
3. Imatong
4. Jubek (Note: Also contains the national capital city of Juba.)
5. Maridi
6. Namorunyang (Note: State was later called Kapoenga.)
7. Terekeka
8. Yei River

=== Greater Upper Nile ===
1. Boma
2. Bieh (Note: State was earlier called Eastern Bieh.)
3. Eastern Nile
4. Fangak (Note: State was earlier called Western Bieh.)
5. Fashoda (Note: State was earlier called Western Nile.)
6. Jonglei
7. Latjoor
8. Northern Liech
9. Ruweng
10. Southern Liech

== 10 states (2011–2015) ==
Flag	State	Capital	Population (2010)	Area (km^{2})	Density (/km^{2})
Bahr el Ghazal
	Northern Bahr el Ghazal	Aweil	820,834	30,543.30	26.87
	Western Bahr el Ghazal	Wau	358,692	91,075.95	3.94
	Lakes	Rumbek	782,504	43,595.08	17.95
	Warrap	Kuajok	1,044,217	45,567.24	22.92
Equatoria
	Western Equatoria	Yambio	658,863	79,342.66	8.30
	Central Equatoria	Juba	1,193,130	43,033.00	27.73
	Eastern Equatoria	Torit	962,719	73,472.01	13.10
Greater Upper Nile
	Jonglei	Bor	1,443,500	122,580.83	11.78
	Unity	Bentiu	645,465	37,836.39	17.06
	Upper Nile	Malakal	1,013,629	77,283.42	13.12
Total
	South Sudan	Juba	8,923,553	644,329.37	13.85

The former ten states of South Sudan grouped in the three historical provinces of the Sudan Bahr el Ghazal Equatoria Greater Upper Nile

== SPLM-IO declaration ==
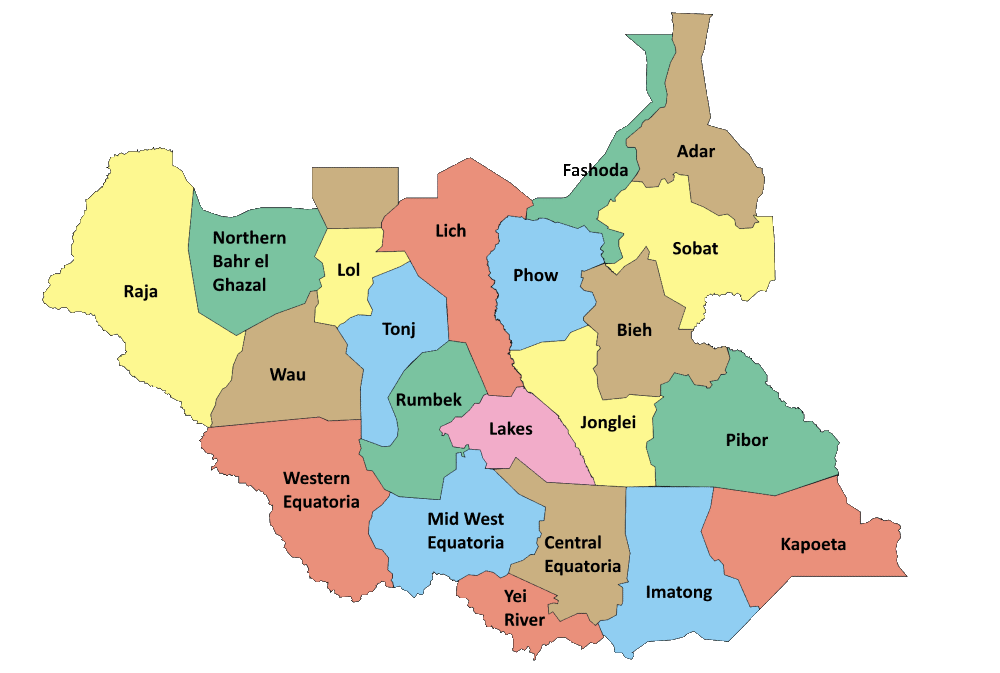
21 States of South Sudan as declared by the SPLM-IO

On 22 December 2014, leader of the SPLM-IO and former vice president Riek Machar declared the 10 states of South Sudan dissolved and the formation of 21 new states in a federal system. The declaration was not recognised by the South Sudanese government. The Sudan Tribune reported on 1 January 2015 that Machar appointed "military governors" for several of his declared states. These states became defunct when the SPLM-IO joined the unity government formed by the R-ARCSS in February 2020.

== See also ==
- List of states of South Sudan by Human Development Index
- List of current state governors in South Sudan
- ISO 3166-2:SS
- States of Sudan
