= Maiwut State =

Former state in South Sudan (2017-2020)

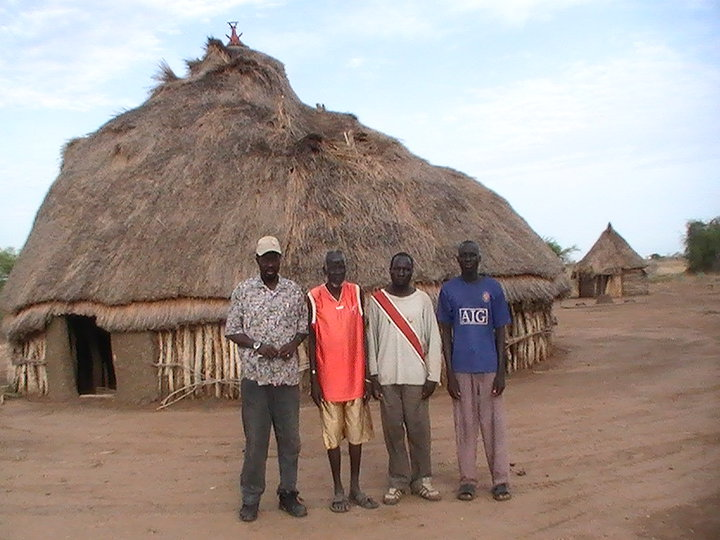
Turu Payam, Maiwut in 2010

Maiwut State was a state in South Sudan that existed between 14 January, 2017 and 22 February, 2020. It is located in the Greater Upper Nile region and it borders Eastern Nile to the north, Eastern Bieh to the south, and Latjoor State to the east.

== History ==
On 14 January, 2017, President Kiir issued a presidential decree that increased the number of federal states from 28 to 32. Thus having Latjor State splitting and forming Maiwut State with Maiwut as its capital, and Koma, Longuchuk, and Maiwut as its 3 new counties.

Bol Ruach Rom was the Governor of Maiwut State.
