= Juma Ali (disambiguation) =

Juma Ali is a Tanzanian politician.

Juma Ali may also refer to:

- Juma Ali Malou, a South Sudanese politician
- Juma Butabika, born Juma Ali, a Ugandan military officer
