= Malakal County =

Coordinates: 9.6337°N 31.6174°E

Makal
- County
- Interactive map of Makal
- Country: South Sudan
- Region: Greater Upper Nile
- State: Upper Nile State
- Payam: 6 payams

Area
  - Total: 754.0 km^{2} (291.1 sq mi)

Population (2017 estimate)
  - Total: 181,498
  - Density: 240.7/km^{2} (623.4/sq mi)
- Time zone: UTC+2 (CAT)

Malakal County is an administrative area in Upper Nile State, in the Greater Upper Nile region of South Sudan.

== Administrative divisions ==
Malakal county is divided into 6 Payams

- Central
- Eastern
- Northern
- Southern
- Lelo
- Ogot
