= Waat =

- Location in South Sudan
- Coordinates: 8°9′25″N 32°10′0″E
- Country: South Sudan
- Region: Greater Upper Nile
- State: Jonglei State
- County: Nyirol County
- Time zone: UTC+2 (CAT)
- Climate: Aw

Waat is a village in the Nyirol County of Jonglei State, in the Greater Upper Nile region of South Sudan. It is connected by road to Faddoi just to the southeast.
