= Fangak State =

State of South Sudan from 2015 to 2020

Fangak State Gezira Area
- State
- Location of Fangak State in South Sudan
- Country: South Sudan
- Capital: Ayod
- Number of Counties: 8

Government
  - Governor: John Kong Nyuon

Population (2014 Estimate)
  - Total: 326,370

Fangak State (previously named Western Bieh State) was a state in South Sudan that existed between 2 October 2015 and 22 February 2020. It was located in the Greater Upper Nile region and it bordered Ruweng to the northwest, Western Nile to the northeast, Eastern Nile to the east, Eastern Bieh to the southeast, Jonglei to the south, Southern Liech to the southwest, and Northern Liech to the west.

== History ==
On 2 October 2015, President Salva Kiir issued a decree establishing 28 states in place of the 10 constitutionally established states. The decree established the new states largely along ethnic lines. A number of opposition parties and civil society groups challenged the constitutionality of the decree. Kiir later resolved to take it to parliament for approval as a constitutional amendment. In November the South Sudanese parliament empowered President Kiir to create new states.

James Kok Ruea was appointed Governor on 24 December. The state was renamed to Fangak State in March 2016.

== Administrative divisions ==
The state consisted of three counties: Fangak, Canal and Ayod.
