= James Kok Ruey =

South Sudanese politician

James Kok Ruea has been the Governor of Western Bieh State, South Sudan since 24 December 2015. He is the first governor of the state, which was created by President Salva Kiir on 2 October 2015. James Kok is currently an MP in National parliament representing Pangak constituency since 2021. He previously served as the Minister of Humanitarian Affairs and Disaster Management and later a Member of Parliament, representing Fangak County in Jonglei. In 2001, he represented the Sudan People's Defense Forces/Democratic Front in negotiations with the Sudan People's Liberation Army, incurring the wrath of less conciliatory SPDF members who saw cooperation as betrayal.
