= Mayiandit County =

Mayiandit County (Haak County)
- County
- Country: South Sudan
- State: Unity State

Area
  - Total: 3,067 km^{2} (1,184 sq mi)

Population (2017 estimate)
  - Total: 80,529
  - Density: 26.26/km^{2} (68.00/sq mi)
- Time zone: UTC+2 (CAT)

Mayiandit County ( Haak County) is a county in Unity State, South Sudan. Before the reorganisation of states in 2015, it was a part of Unity State. Inhabitant by Haak Nuer people of Unity state Bentiu.
