= Peter Lam Both =

South Sudanese diplomat (born 1972)

Peter Lam Both (born in 1972) was the first appointed Governor of Latjoor, South Sudan, established by President Salva Kiir on 2 October 2015. Both is a high-ranking South Sudanese diplomat of the Sudan People's Liberation Movement (SPLM), Peter served as Secretary General of SPLM from August 2021- February 2025.

== Career ==
Both was as appointed as Commissioner for National Relief and Rehabilitation Commission in the National Government of South Sudan on 7 June 2012 by President Salva Kiir. He served in this position until 27 November 2013.

Before the outbreak of South Sudan crisis on 15 December 2013, Both alleged on national SSTV that the Vice President was provoking a crisis in the country. Both and a group of other Jikany leaders met with former Vice President Riek Machar on 4 May 2013, during which they warned him not to politicize the community of Nuer in an SPLM power struggle. On 6 May 2013, Both and Riek Machar met in his office in which Riek wanted to find out from him what he talked about on National SSTV on 1 May 2013. In front of his aides, Both explained to Riek that he was taking the country to brink of war by invoking ethnic Nuer sentiments to support his bid for chairmanship of the party rather than using SPLM political platform to convince voters to elect him. Both was the first official to call on South Sudanese leaders to stop the crisis before it happened, but instead, Both was criticized by Dr. Riek's supporters like Hon. Gatluak Riek Jaak and Hon. John Chuol Char saying that he was not being truthful and that Dr. Machar was not provoking any crisis in the country. Both was also criticized by Nuer Diaspora elements who are staunch supporters of Dr. Riek Machar. But, Both was vindicated on 15 December 2013 when war broke out and members of the Nuer community became victims of the crisis because they are from Riek's ethnic group. Both remained loyal to SPLM under the leadership of President Salva Kiir as a symbol of unity and national integration.

Peter Lam Both served as State Minister of Information and Communications in Upper Nile State from June 2010-May 2012. He was also appointed as SPLM Deputy Secretary for External Relations on August 28, 2009. Both was previously posted to Canada from May 2006- November 2008 as the first official Representative of the SPLM to Canada. Both was also acting as the Chief Representative for the newly formed Government of Southern Sudan. Both was charged by the SPLM leadership to organize SPLM Chapters in various cities of Canada and to rally the support of the Government of Canada for SPLM and Government of Southern Sudan.

Both helped form 14 SPLM Chapters across the country with membership of over 4000. Both managed to diplomatically seduce Canada to accept SPLM and work with the Government of Southern Sudan, which finally culminated in the establishment of the Liaison Office for the Government of Southern Sudan in Ottawa in 2008 in accordance with the provisions of the Comprehensive Peace Agreement(CPA) and the Interim Constitution of Southern Sudan. Canada is known internationally for refusing to work with rebels, a case signaled by their refusal to work with the former leader of SPLM Dr. John Garang de Mabior. Both was one of the key leaders of Sudanese community in Canada who defeated Talisman Energy of Canada.

Both, a lecturer of Social Work at the University of Calgary, University of Lethbridge and Mount Royal College in Canada, joined SPLM in 1986 after he fled from Sudan at the age of 14 due to civil war. He lived in various refugee camps in Ethiopia, but managed to continue his education with the help of the United Nations High Commissioner for Refugees(UNHCR). Both graduated with B.A. in Political Science and International Relations (1996) in Addis Ababa University in Ethiopia (the oldest university in the continent). Both also graduated with Bachelor of Social Work (2002) and Masters of International Social Work (2004) from the University of Calgary. Both is in his final stages of his Ph.D. dissertation in the Faculty of Social Work, University of Calgary.

In addition to his diplomatic work as SPLM/GOSS Representative to Canada, Both has extensive diplomatic experience in his work with United Nations in Ethiopia (1996), India (2003) and Jordan in 2005. He has worked with various organizations in Canada including Calgary Catholic Immigration Society as Settlement Officer (1998–2000) and with the City of Calgary as Community Development Officer (2002–2005) and as a Social Planner with the City of Calgary (2005–present). Both led the first ever SPLM delegation from Canada in May 2008 to participate in the Second SPLM National Convention in Juba where Both played a key role in mobilizing the delegates to maintain the unity of SPLM by proposing to keep the current leadership as it is. The SPLM unity was at stake in the convention, but the party rose to the challenge and opted to keep the status quo.

Both submitted his resignation to the chairman of the SPLM on November 15, 2008, stating that he was time pressed with his studies. But those who monitored the situation in Canada said that he was humiliated when the Liaison Office for the Government of Southern Sudan was appointed and left him and key SPLM leaders in Canada out of the office. Both did not know how to explain this action to the SPLM leaders in Canada who thought Both had a role in the appointments. At the same time, Both could not point fingers at the leaders in Juba who actually did the appointments due to the political sensitivity of the issue. The appointments made were seen by all southern Sudanese in Canada as tribally motivated, but what is puzzling is that Both is known to detest tribalism and could not possibly be linked to those appointments. Resignation was an easy route for him to avoid being associated with those appointments. But Both always denied those claims, saying that he has completed the work he was asked to do. Both always says, "I have accomplished what was hard to do; what has remained now is the day today management of the chapters and the nurturing of our bilateral diplomatic relations with Canada, which does not require rocket science."

In January 2023, the SPLM swore in Peter Lam Both as its Secretary General.

=== Publications ===
His publications include South Sudan: forgotten tragedy (2003) and International Relations of Ethiopia (2004). Both has also published peer-reviewed articles with Journal of Social Work and Journal of Educational Action Research in 2008.
