= Twic State =

State of South Sudan from 2015 to 2020

Twic State Twic
- State
- Nicknames: Twic Bol Nyuol, Twic Mayardit
- Location of Twic in South Sudan
- Country: South Sudan
- Number of Counties: 6

Population (2014 Estimate)
  - Total: 543,410

Twic State was a state in South Sudan that existed between 2 October 2015 and 22 February 2020. It was located in the Bahr el Ghazal region and it bordered Aweil East to the west, the disputed Abyei region to the north, Gogrial to the south, Northern Liech to the east, and Ruweng to the northeast. The population of Twic State was recorded at 204,905 in 2008, and was estimated at a population of 543,410 in 2014. The capital of the state was Mayen-Abun, with an estimated population of around 2,000 people in city limits.

== History ==
On 2 October 2015, President Salva Kiir issued a decree establishing 28 states in place of the 10 constitutionally established states. The decree established the new states largely along ethnic lines. A number of opposition parties and civil society groups challenged the constitutionality of the decree. Kiir later resolved to take it to parliament for approval as a constitutional amendment. In November the South Sudanese parliament empowered President Kiir to create new states.

Bona Panek was appointed Governor on 24 December.

== Geography ==
=== Administrative divisions ===
Twic state is made up of six counties created in February 2016. These counties were created by the governor of the state. These counties are Akoc County, Pannyok County, Wunrok County, Ajak County, Turalei County and Aweng County. Along with the creation of these counties, six county deputies have been appointed for each county.

Turalei was the county's HQs and it is also the state's largest city, with over 2,000 residents. The issue of the capital became a major debate when Mayen Abun was decreed as the seat of state government from Turalei, the longtime capital of Twic County. However the state government promised to settle the issue amicably and consultative meetings have been undergoing on as the way forward to reach solution.
