= Panykang County =

Coordinates: 9°26′10″N 31°21′24″E

Panyikang
- County
- Interactive map of Panyikang
- Country: South Sudan
- Region: Greater Upper Nile
- State: Upper Nile State

Area
  - Total: 5,038 km^{2} (1,945 sq mi)

Population (2017 estimate)
  - Total: 65,117
  - Density: 12.93/km^{2} (33.48/sq mi)
- Time zone: UTC+2 (CAT)

Panyikang County is an administrative area in Upper Nile State, in the Greater Upper Nile region of South Sudan. Panyikang County is situated in Upper Nile State, within the Greater Upper Nile region of South Sudan. Covering an area of approximately 5,038 square kilometers, it had an estimated population of 70,117 as of 2017.

== Geography ==
Borders, rivers (White Nile, Sobat), area (5,038 km²).

The White Nile River traverses the county in a V-shape, converging near Malakal town. Additionally, the Sobat River delineates part of the county's eastern boundary before merging with the White Nile. These waterways are vital for transportation, fishing, and agriculture.

=== Geographical boundaries ===
Panyikang County shares borders with several regions:

- Northeast: Malakal County
- East: Baliet County
- South: Fangak and Canal/Pigi counties in Jonglei State
- West: Ruweng Administrative Area
- North: The international border with Sudan

== Administrative divisions ==
Payams

- Tonga (headquarters)
- Anakdiar
- Dhothim
- Pakang
- Panyikang
- Panyidway (Doleib hill)

== Demographics ==
- Population: ~65,117 (2017 estimate)
- Ethnic groups: Shilluk (Chollo)

== Economy ==
- Agriculture (sorghum, maize, cowpeas and gum arabic), livestock, fishing
- Challenges: flooding, displacement, conflict

== Infrastructure ==
- Roads: limited and seasonal
- River transport: significant but insecure
- Education: 18 primary schools, 1 secondary school (Dr. Kunjwok)
- Health: 15 health facilities (PHCUs and PHCCs), no hospitals

== Infrastructure and access ==
- Transportation: The county has limited road infrastructure, with some secondary roads connecting to neighboring regions. However, seasonal conditions often render these roads impassable. River transport along the Nile is a crucial means of moving people and goods, although insecurity has affected its reliability.
- Healthcare: As of 2022, Panyikang had 15 health facilities, including five Primary Health Care Units (PHCUs) and two Primary Health Care Centers (PHCCs). There were no hospitals reported in the county .csrf-southsudan.org
- Education: The county hosts 18 primary schools and one secondary school (Dr. Kunjwok Secondary) in Tonga Payam. There are no Early Childhood Development centers reported.

== Humanitarian situation ==
- 2023: classified as facing “Catastrophic” needs by OCHA - 84% of population in need of assistance
