= Northern Liech State =

State of South Sudan from 2015 to 2020

Northern Liech
- State
- Location of Northern Liech in South Sudan
- Country: South Sudan
- Capital: Bentiu
- Number of Counties: 4

Population (2014 Estimate)
  - Total: 561,240

Northern Liech was a state in South Sudan that existed between 2 October 2015 and 22 February 2020. It was located in the Greater Upper Nile region and it bordered Ruweng to the north, Western Bieh to the east, Southern Liech to the south, Tonj to the south, and Gogrial and Twic to the west.

== History ==
On 2 October 2015, President Salva Kiir issued a decree establishing 28 states in place of the 10 constitutionally established states. The decree established the new states largely along ethnic lines. A number of opposition parties and civil society groups challenged the constitutionality of the decree. Kiir later resolved to take it to parliament for approval as a constitutional amendment. In November the South Sudanese parliament empowered President Kiir to create new states.

Joseph Monytuil was appointed Governor on 24 December.

== Administrative divisions ==
The state consisted of 4 counties:

- Rubkona County
- Guit County
- Koch County
- Mayom County
