= James Koang Chuol =

South Sudanese military officer and politician

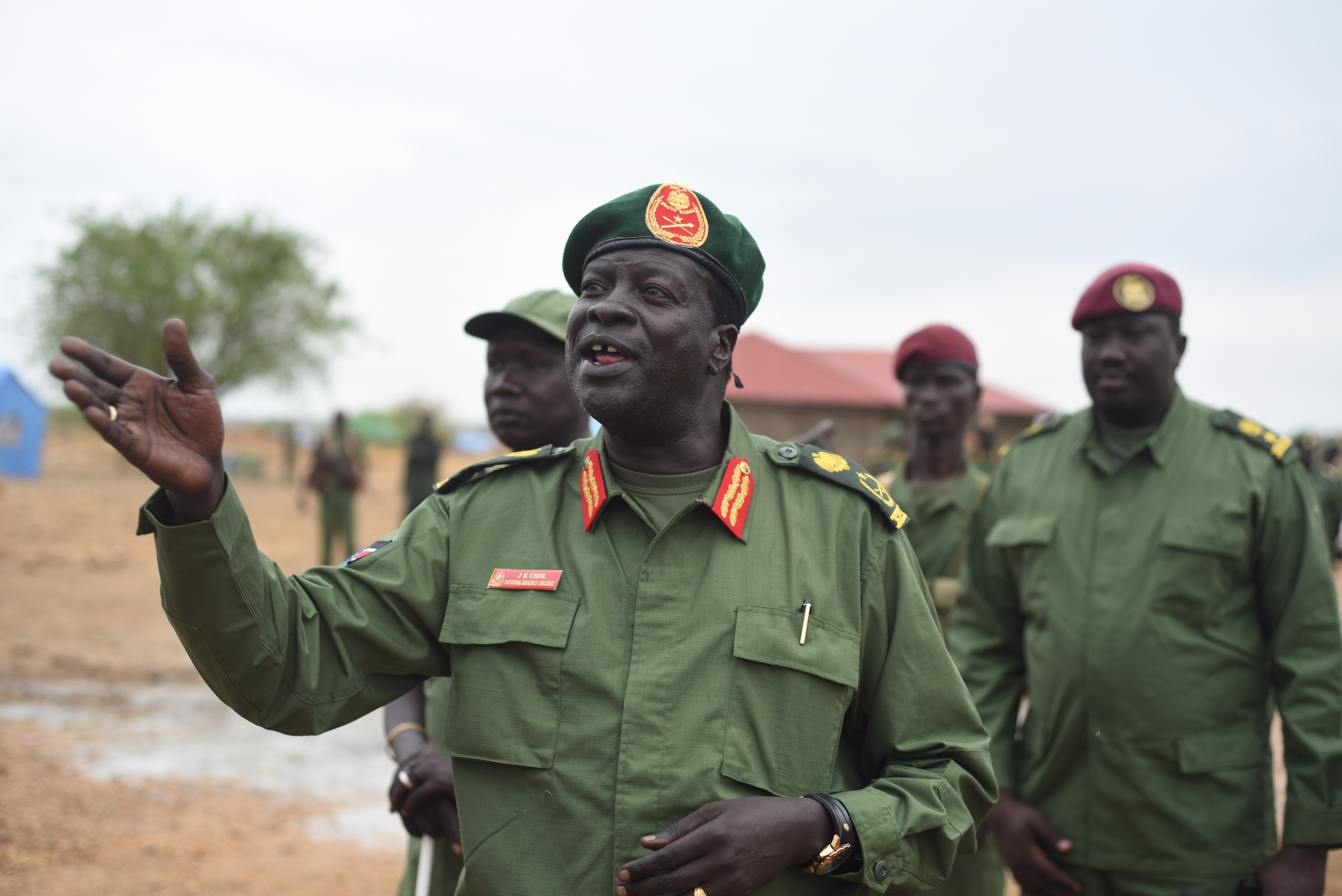
- Koang speaking to SPLA-IO soldiers, 2016

Governor of Upper Nile
- In office 19 March 2025 – 3 October 2025
- Preceded by: James Odhok
- Succeeded by: Jacon Dollar Ruot
- Incumbent
- Assumed office 4 May 2026
- Preceded by: Jacon Dollar Ruot

Personal details
- Born: 1961 (age 64–65)
- Party: Sudan People's Liberation Movement (SPLM)

James Koang Chuol (born 1961) is a South Sudanese military officer and politician. Koang has served as governor of Upper Nile State since May 2026, having been reappointed by President Salva Kiir.

== Political career ==
On 20 December 2013, Koang – having previously served as commander of the SPLA 4th Division – declared himself military governor of Unity State. His forces then clashed with those loyal to Kiir, resulting in the forces loyal to Kiir retreating to the barraks in Bentiu. The next day, Koang announced allegiance to Machar and declared an 'interim government' of the state, with state governor Joseph Nguen Monytuel fleeing Mayom County.

In December 2014, Koang was appointed as commander of the Sudan People's Liberation Army-In Opposition (SPLA-IO) special division.

In July 2015, the United Nations Security Council Committee for South Sudan listed Koang on a sanctions list, citing his position as a leader of forces whose members have engaged in the widespread targeting and sexual violence of civilians that constitute a violation of international humanitarian law.

Koang was appointed governor of Upper Nile State on 19 March 2025. In October 2025, President Salva Kiir relieved Koang from the position and replaced him with Jacob Dollar, the former state legislative assembly speaker. In May 2026, Koang was reappointed to governor of Upper Nile State by President Salva Kirr.
