= Bagari County =

- Country: South Sudan
- State: Wau State
  - Summer (DST): +3GMT

Bagari County is an administrative area in Wau State, South Sudan.
