= Akoka County =

- County
- Country: South Sudan
- State: Upper Nile State
- Established: 2005
- Headquarters: Bienythiang

Population (2022)
  - Total: 80,016
- Time zone: UTC+2 (CAT)

Akoka County is one of the thirteen counties of Upper Nile State, South Sudan. Its headquarters is located in Bienythiang town. The county was formally recognized in 2005 as part of the administrative restructuring of Southern Sudan.

== Geography ==
Akoka County lies in the northern part of Upper Nile State with the following borders:

- *South* – Malakal City Council and Baliet County
- *East, North East & South East* – Longechuk, Ulang, Nasir and Maban Counties
- *North* – Melut County
- *West* – Fashoda and Panyikang Counties (across the Nile)

The county is composed of six payams:

- Bienythiang (County HQ)
- Akoka
- Rom
- Akotweng (Akuetweng)
- Wunthou
- Achony

These payams are further divided into 22 bomas and more than 214 villages.

== The Establishment of Akoka County in 2005 ==
Akoka County was established in the government of South Sudan, and it was number thirteen (13), in the list of upper Nile State Counties 2005, Counties includes;

1. Malakal County
2. Panyikang County
3. Fashoda County
4. Manyo County
5. Renk County
6. Melut County
7. Baliet County
8. Maban County
9. Longechuk County
10. Maiwut County
11. Luakpiny County (Nasir)
12. Ulang County
13. Akoka County

== Population ==
The 2009 census recorded a population of 16,313 across four payams (then under Baliet County). By 2022, the estimated population had increased to about 80,016 people, partly due to migration and displacement from conflict-affected areas of Jonglei and Upper Nile.

== Livelihoods and Humanitarian Context ==
Most of Akoka’s residents depend on subsistence agriculture, fishing, and livestock keeping.

- Agriculture: Sorghum, maize, and vegetables are cultivated using both rain-fed and irrigation methods.
- Livestock: Cattle, goats, and sheep are central to the economy.
- Natural resources: Fertile soils, forests (honey, timber, gum arabic), and fisheries from the Nile.

=== Humanitarian challenges ===
Akoka County continues to experience multiple humanitarian challenges linked to recurrent flooding , limited infrastructure , and protection concerns . The county is home to both returnees and host communities who rely heavily on humanitarian support due to disrupted livelihoods and weak access to basic services. Local authorities and community structures, including the Relief and Rehabilitation Commission (RRC) Monylobi Kon Aduar, Nyok Bol Deng Radio Operators and Community Protection Committees (CPCs), play a critical role in supporting affected populations; however, their capacities remain constrained by resource gaps and environmental shocks.

Key POC Challenges in Akoka County

During the Focus Group Discussion (FGD) with the Relief and Rehabilitation Commission (RRC) representative and local authorities, facilitated by Thrive Africa Initiative with support from United Nations Mission in South Sudan (UNMISS), the following challenges were highlighted:

- Limited WASH Facilities – Akoka County headquarters currently relies on only one functional water pump, with urgent needs for additional WASH services in Akoka Payam and surrounding areas.
- Flooding and Infrastructure Damage – Seasonal floods have submerged schools and health facilities, particularly in Bionythiang and Rom Payams, disrupting education and access to health services.
- Food Insecurity – Severe flooding has destroyed farmlands and disrupted livelihoods, leaving communities highly food insecure.
- Gender-Based Violence (GBV) and Protection Concerns – The absence of women’s safe spaces and a dedicated office for the Community Protection Committee (CPC)—formed and trained by Thrive Africa Initiative with support from UNMISS between July and September 2025—limits effective protection responses.
- Youth and Women Livelihood Opportunities – Lack of sustainable livelihood initiatives for youth and women increases vulnerability, dependency, and exposure to protection risks.

These challenges underscore the urgent need for coordinated humanitarian interventions and strengthened local capacities to enhance protection of civilians, improve service delivery, and support resilience in Akoka County.

== Administration ==
Akoka County has been administered by a series of commissioners since 2009.

=== List of Commissioners ===
1. Ayong Awer Lual (2009–2010)
2. Ajak Ador Khor (2010–2012)
3. Daniel Yhor Akech (2012–2014)
4. Mum Ador Mum (2014–2016)
5. Abraham Chol Chan (2016)
6. Chol Lual Chol (2016–2018)
7. Mum Ador Mum (2018–2020)
8. Gieth Ador Nul (2021–2022)
9. Wai Ayong Wai Juach (2022–2023)
10. Majok James Chol (2023–2024)
11. Gew Chol Yach (2024–2025)
12. James Chol Ador (2025–2026)
13. Awer Juac Kejok( 2026 _ 22 / September)
14. Awer Juac Kejok ( Caretaker commissioner present )

== History & Origin of Akoka ==
The first former civil governor of Upper Nile Province (1926-31), in British colonial government of Sudan, Mr. A.C. Willis, in his book entitled "Handbook of Upper Nile Province (1930-1931)", edited by Doughlas, descripted the land of Akoka as a land of "triangle" located south of Khor-Adar tributaries (stream), to north of Sobat River. Therefore, Akoka County is bordering with Melut County in the North, bordering with Longechuk County in the east of the area, at the land of Swamps (Toch), at Kol-Machar, Chong-gon-achuoth and Nuldit villages. The County is bordering with Nasir and Ulang Counties at south-east of the area, at the village of Patoknaam, and it is bordering with Baliet County in the south, at Wiekjur village north of Sobat River. Akoka County is bordering with Fashoda and Panyikang Counties in the middle of the River Nile, where Fashoda and Panyikang Counties are located in Shilluk (Chollo) kingdom on the west bank of the river Nile.

Akoka county derived her name from one of Dongjol community historical villages called "Akoka", sound as "Akok-ka", which means to "appease me" in Jieng (Dinka) national language. It was made as one of slave trades centers, at the time of Turks-Egyptian government (1821-189), and it also continued as a settled station of upper Nile province during British-colonial period from 1899 to 1955. Akoka continued as the Sudan government station under Malakal administration since the independence of Sudan, where Akoka, Malakal town, and Baliet formed the former "Sobat rural council", with its HQs in Malakal in 1956.

Akoka was promoted into Payam (locality) in 1993, as well as "Bionythiang county’, after SPLM/A first-national convention, conducted at Chukdum in Eastern Equatoria state in 1994; then, the County changed her name from Bionythiang to Akoka county during the formation of the government of Southern Sudan in 2005.

Akoka County at present, is one of the seventy-nine (79) Counties in South Sudan, established in 2005, but before the County Commissioner was appointed in 2009, Akoka four (4) payams, such as Akoka, Rom, Akotweng, & Wunthou were operated under Baliet county from 9 January 2005 to November 2009, and Southern Sudan’s fifth (5) housing census, was administratively conducted under supervision of Baliet County in Akoka area, from 2008 to June 2009.

The appointment of Akoka County’s first Commissioner on date 10 December 2009, politically and administratively marked the establishment of Akoka County, with her existed four payams as mentioned above. Bionythiang Payam was established, during the time of the first and second commissioners in 2010, and Achony Payam was established in 2017, at the time of the 5th and 6th commissioners of Akoka County, now, the County is administratively operated under six (6) Payams, (22) Bomas, and more than 214 villages.

=== Dongjol people of Southern Sudan ===
Where did the name Dongjol come from and what does it mean?

Historically, the name Dongjol originated from spiritual leader of Dongjol community called "Ayong Ayuel Goch" (Ayongdit) , who let his people during the time of migration in ancient time and settled in the current land of Akoka county. The name Dongjol is a combination of two (2) names, as spelled out "Dong-jol" , or "Dong-ku-Jol" . Dong means strike or hit and Jol means to increase , which are written as "increase-strike" or "strike-increased" , that sound like a proverb meaning "the problem never ends" .

Dongjol is one of twelve (12) clans of Jieng Padang , since, Jieng was divided into four Major groups, according to their related linguistics, and the four major groups of Jieng are Jieng Agaar , Jieng Rek , Jieng Padang and Jieng Bor , and the twelve clans of Jieng Padang are Dongjol, Nyiel, Ageer, Abielang, Ngok Lual Yak, Luach, Thoi, Rut, Paweny, Ruweng, Aloor, and Ngok Jok (Abyei).

Sub-clans of Dongjol community

There are sixteen (16) Sub-clans of Dongjol community;

1. Payang (Pan-Ayong)
2. Payuel Ajak (Wunwetbuk)
3. Pakuei
4. Panyok
5. Pagiiu
6. Pakuor-Titnyin
7. Kongor
8. Giir
9. Payuer
10. Panyitbeek
11. Pakuor
12. Payuel Angou
13. Ameel
14. Chaai
15. Guchweng Awer
16. Apien (Pagot & Paduer)

Traditional Authority of Dongjol community:

In ancient time, it was true that the government of a clan, as well as the whole tribes, before any form of government in South Sudan, were the elders of the community. The elders and the spear masters, acted as local government of the community. The mission for the migration of Ayuel Goch Ayuel’s people of Dongjol was to settle in the present land of Dongjol community, and the people continued with his successor son known as Ayong Ayuel Goch from first to thirteen centuries (1-1300) A.D, with Ayongdit’s first successors from 1400 AD to 2023 AD.

The traditional authority of Dongjol people in Southern Sudan began from Akuei Ayuel Koch as Sultan of Dongjol community, in Turk-Egyptian government of Sudan between 1821-1897, and this traditional authority continued, under the leadership of chief Ayuel Akuei Ayuel in British-colonial government of Sudan from 1899-1925, for Dongjol as one community. But, in 1926, Dongjol community was divided into two (2) chiefdoms .

1. Gambany chiefdom with eight (8) sub-clans-under chief Ayuel Akuei Ayuel
2. Guchweng chiefdom (Guchweng & Ametker) with eight (8) sub-clans under Chief Deng Chol.

The traditional authority leadership of Dongjol continued with two chiefs from 1926-1941, then Guchweng chiefdom was divided into two chiefdoms of Guchweng and Ametker in 1942, Ametker chiefdom its independence chief with three (3) sub-clans and Guchweng with five (5) sub-clans, and the whole Dongjol was three (3) chiefdoms at that time from 1942-1993.

1. Gambany with eight (8) sub-clans -let by chief Nyok Ayuel
2. Guchweng with five (5) sub-clans-chiefs-Ajuong Ador-Ayong Dengdit-Chol Ador and Thon Chol Juach
3. Ametker with three sub-clans under Chiefs Monyyong Ding Kir,Dau Angok for five (5) months,Ajak Kejok and Thon Wai Awin as chief for long time.

In 1994, Gambany chiefdoms was divided into two (2) chiefdoms, such as Pan-ayuel with four (4) sub-clans and Diewuot-Agook with four (4) sub-clans; Dongjol community from 1994-2005, was run by four (4) chiefdoms.

1. Pan-ayuel Chiefdom with four (4) sub-clans- Chief Nyok Ayuel
2. Diewuot-Agook with four (4) sub-clans-Chief Chol Ayul and Thuch Dau.
3. Guchweng with five (5) sub-clans- Chiefs Mum Pal and Ayuel Kur Ayuel
4. Ametker with three (3) sub-clans- Chief Thon Wai Awin

The 7 Division of Dongjol Kingdom:

1. Pan-ayuel chiefdom with four (4) sub-clans (Payang, Payuel Ajak, Pakuei, and Panyok)
2. Titnyin chiefdom with two (2) sub-clans (Pagieu & Pakuor Titnyin
3. Diewuot chiefdom with two (2) sub-clans (Kongor & Giir)
4. Chiengwau (Guchweng Yhor) chiefdom with three (3) sub-clans (Payuer, Pakuor, and Ameel)
5. Thieng (Guchweng Juach) chiefdom with two (2) sub-clans (Panyitbeek & Payuel-Angou)
6. Atiekdou chiefdom with two (2) sub-clans (Chaai & Guchweng-Awer)
7. Nyiel (Apien) chiefdom with two (2) sub-clans (Pagot and Paduer).

Traditional authority Leaders of Akoka County 2024:

1. Mr. Chuuli Guot Ajak-Paramount chief
2. Mr. Anyang Amol-Deputy paramount chief
3. Mr.Akech Ayuel Git-Chief of Pan-yuel chiefdom
4. Mr. Awan Arob----chief of Titnyin chiefdom
5. Mr. Dhur Bol Dhur ---chief of Diewuot chiefdom
6. Mr. Thon Agieu Chuang-chief of chiengwau chiefdom
7. Mr. Padiet Denng Akuei -Chief of Thieng chiefdom
8. Awer Nyok Awer-chief of Atiekdou chiefdom
9. Mr. Deng Luth -chief of Nyiel (Apien) chiefdom.

== Map ==
Akoka County appears as one of the 13 counties of Upper Nile State on the official 2005 map.

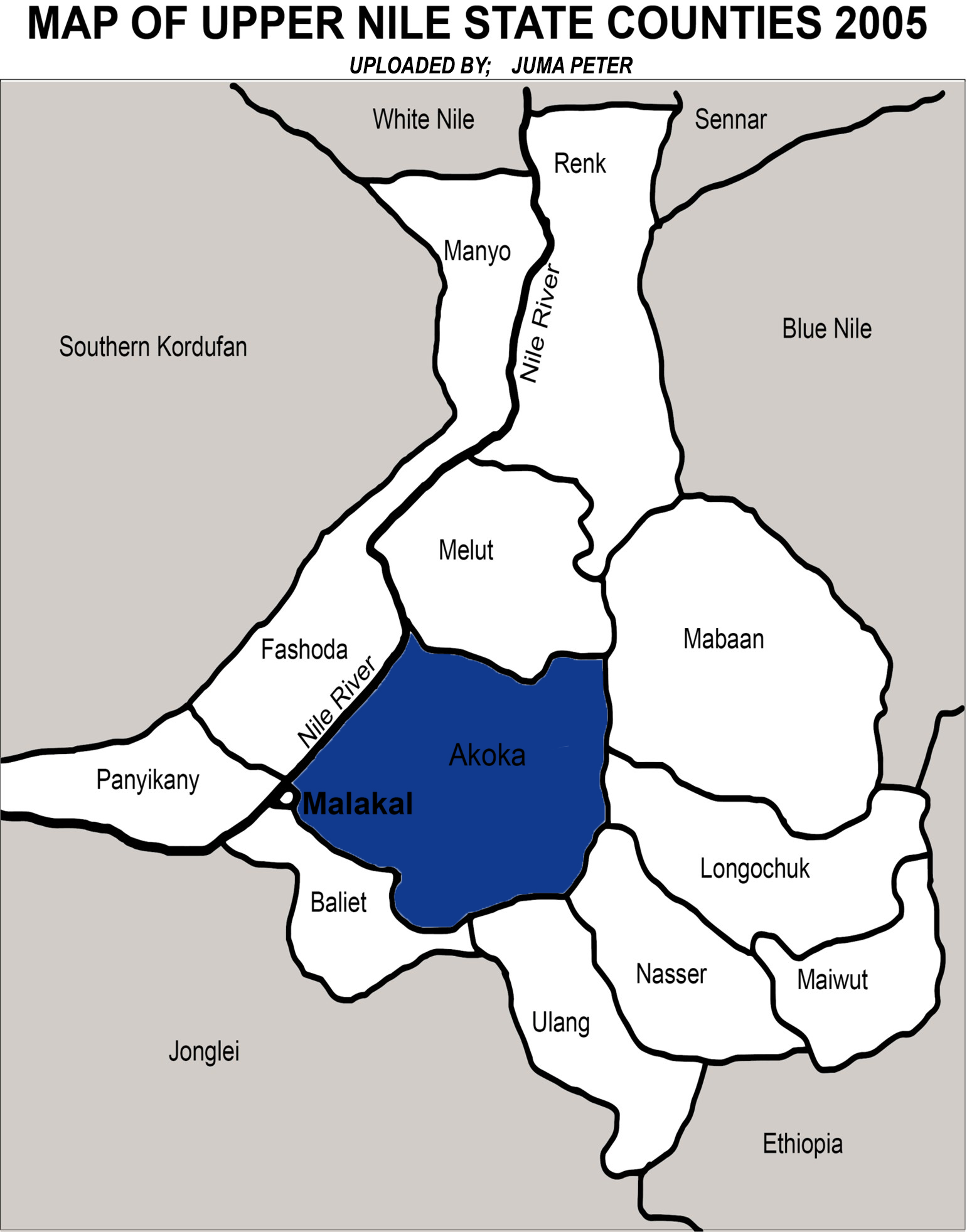
Map of Upper Nile State counties (2005) with Akoka County highlighted. Used to illustrate the Wikipedia article on Akoka County.

== See also ==
- Upper Nile (state)
- Counties of South Sudan
