= Peter Chol Wal =

South Sudanese politician

Peter Chol Wal is a South Sudanese politician and is a member of the Sudan People's Liberation Movement (SPLM).

He was one of six SPLM candidates elected on the party list to the Jonglei State Legislative Assembly in 2010. He was appointed Speaker in December 2010.
