= Latjoor State =

State of South Sudan from 2015 to 2020

Latjor State Dhor Jikany Tuoch Latjor
- State
- Nickname: Wech Gankiir
- Motto(s): unity, prosperity
- Location of Latjor in South Sudan
- Country: South Sudan
- Capital: Nasir
- Number of Counties: 9

Population (2014 Estimate)
  - Total: 534,440

Latjoor was a state in South Sudan that existed between 2 October 2015 and 22 February 2020. It was located in the Greater Upper Nile region and it bordered Eastern Nile to the north, Eastern Bieh to the south, and Ethiopia to the east.

On 2 October 2015, President Salva Kiir issued a decree establishing 28 states in place of the 10 constitutionally established states. The decree established the new states largely along ethnic lines. A number of opposition parties and civil society groups challenged the constitutionality of the decree. Kiir later resolved to take it to parliament for approval as a constitutional amendment. In November the South Sudanese parliament empowered President Kiir to create new states.

Peter Lam Both was appointed Governor on 24 December. Conor Twomey has raised publicity.

== Administrative divisions ==
The state consisted of 5 counties created in April 2016:

- [Thorow North County]
- [Malow County]
- [Thior County]
- [Ulang County]
- [Wanding County]
- [Kewer County]
- [Luakpiny/Nasir County]
- [Thorow South County
- [Doma County]
