= Manyo County =

Coordinates: 11°28′41″N 32°26′38″E

Manyo
- County
- Interactive map of Manyo
- Country: South Sudan
- State: Upper Nile State

Area
  - Total: 6,671 km^{2} (2,576 sq mi)

Population (2017 estimate)
  - Total: 54,034
  - Density: 8.100/km^{2} (20.98/sq mi)
- Time zone: UTC+2 (CAT)

Manyo is a county in Upper Nile State, South Sudan.
