= Panriang County =

Panrieng County
- County
- Location in South Sudan
- Country: South Sudan
- State: Ruweng Administrative Area

Area
  - Total: 3,466 sq mi (8,977 km^{2})

Population (2017 estimate)
  - Total: 123,419
  - Density: 35.61/sq mi (13.75/km^{2})
- Time zone: UTC+2 (CAT)

Panriang County is an administrative area in the Ruweng Administrative Area, South Sudan.
