= Guit County =

- County
- Location in South Sudan
- Country: South Sudan
- Region: Greater Upper Nile
- State: Unity State

Area
  - Total: 1,334 sq mi (3,456 km^{2})

Population (2017 estimate)
  - Total: 49,018
  - Density: 36.73/sq mi (14.18/km^{2})
- Time zone: UTC+2 (CAT)

Guit County is an administrative area of Unity State in the Greater Upper Nile region of South Sudan. It has been impacted by the South Sudanese Civil War.

As of August 2015, outsiders had little if any access to Guit County, due to the fighting that began in Dec. 2013.

A large number of people were displaced during fighting in early 2015.

"According to SSRRA officials, besides 2540 vulnerable host population in Nimni, the payam is paying host to about 14,000 IDPs, most of them women and children. Nimni and the four adjacent payams are also hosting an aggregate of approximately 70,000 IDPs."

IRNA reported that Guit County had also suffered damage from flooding in August 2014.

As of April 2015, both animals and people were suffering a high morbidity rate due to difficult conditions. "People are surviving on wild foods including water lilies, lalob fruit, and very limited fish. Large scale animal morbidity and mortality has meant diminishing milk production and unfavorable terms of trade for herders."

Notable people from Guit County include Taban Deng Gai, a Jikany Nuer who is a former governor of Unity state, and a leader of the SPLM/A–IO.

Refugees from Werni in the eastern Nuba Mountains have accused the Sudanese Armed Forces (SAF) of using famine as a weapon to force them to flee.

The Chotyiel Primary Health Care Centre in Chotyiel Payam, which includes a maternity ward, was assessed in 2021 as having "poor capacity."

Journalists who visited Chotyiel in 2023 found local people scavenging for water lilly bulbs, and were told that nearby lands submerged by flooding would need three to four years of dry weather to become usable again.
