= Juma Ali Malou =

South Sudanese politician

Juma Ali Malou has been the Governor of Terekeka State, South Sudan since 24 December 2015. He is the first governor of the state, which was created by President Salva Kiir on 2 October 2015.

He previously served as the governor of Central Equatoria.
