= Bieh State =

State of South Sudan from 2015 to 2020

Bieh
- State of South Sudan
- Location of Bieh in South Sudan
- Country: South Sudan
- Counties: 2: Nyirol; Uror
- Capital: Waat

Area
  - Total: 19,279 km^{2} (7,444 sq mi)

Population (2008 census)
  - Total: 287,193
  - Density: 14.897/km^{2} (38.582/sq mi)
- Time zone: UTC+3
  - Summer (DST): not observed

Bieh State (previously named Eastern Bieh State) was a state in South Sudan that existed between 2 October 2015 and 22 February 2020. It was located in the Greater Upper Nile region and it bordered Fangak to the west, Central Upper Nile to the north, Latjoor and Akobo to the east, and Jonglei to the south.

== History ==
On 2 October 2015, President Salva Kiir issued a decree establishing 28 states in place of the 10 constitutionally established states. The decree established the new states largely along ethnic lines. Several opposition parties and civil society groups challenged the constitutionality of the decree. Kiir later resolved to take it to parliament for approval as a constitutional amendment. In November, the South Sudanese parliament empowered President Kiir to create new states.

== Administrative divisions ==
The state consisted of 2 counties:

- Nyirol
- Uror
