= Northern Upper Nile State =

State of South Sudan from 2017 to 2020

Northern Upper Nile
- State
- Country: South Sudan
- Capital: Renk
- Time zone: UTC+3 (EAT)

Northern Upper Nile was a state in South Sudan that existed between January 2017 and February 2020.
