= Central Upper Nile State =

State of South Sudan from 2017 to 2020

Central Upper Nile
- State
- Country: South Sudan
- Region: Greater Upper Nile
- Number of counties: 4
- Capital: Malakal
- Time zone: UTC+3 (EAT)

Central Upper Nile was a state in South Sudan that existed between January 2017 and 22 February 2020.
