= Terekeka State =

State of South Sudan from 2015 to 2020

- State
- Location of Terekeka State in South Sudan
- Country: South Sudan
- Capital: Terekeka
- Number of Counties: 5

Population (2014 Estimate)
  - Total: 176,030

Terekeka State was a state in South Sudan that existed between 2 October 2015 and 22 February 2020. It was located in the Equatoria region and it bordered Amadi, Eastern Lakes, Imatong, Jonglei, and Jubek. It has an estimated population of 176,030 in 2014, and the capital and largest city of the state is Terekeka, South Sudan.

== History ==
Before Terekeka State was formed, On 2 October 2015, President Salva Kiir issued a decree establishing 28 states in place of the 10 constitutionally established states. The decree established the new states largely along ethnic lines. A number of opposition parties and civil society groups challenged the constitutionality of the decree. Kiir later resolved to take it to parliament for approval as a constitutional amendment. In November the South Sudanese parliament empowered President Kiir to create new states.

Juma Ali Malou was appointed Governor on 24 December.

== Geography ==
Terekeka is located in the Equatoria region of South Sudan, being part of Central Equatoria before the ten original states split up. The state borders the other states of Eastern Lakes to the northwest, Jonglei to the northeast, Imatong to the east, Jubek to the south, and Amadi to the west.

=== Administrative divisions ===
The state consists of 5 counties created during the split up of the original ten states. The five counties are Terekeka County, Jemeza County, Tali County, Tigor County, and Gwor County.

=== Towns and cities ===
The capital of the state of Terekeka is the city of Terekeka. The town is located on the western bank of the Nile River. The town lies approximately 53 miles north of Juba, the capital and largest city of the country. Other towns in Terekeka State include Boko and Jerbar.
