= Unity State =

State of South Sudan

Unity State Lich Western Upper Nile
- State
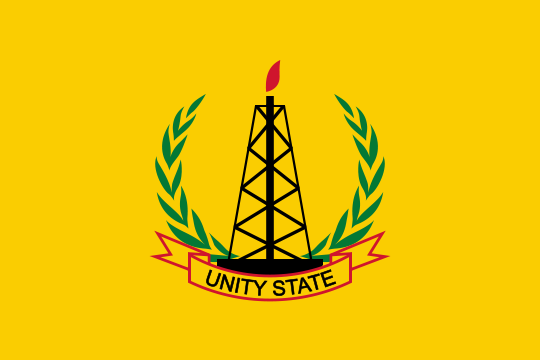
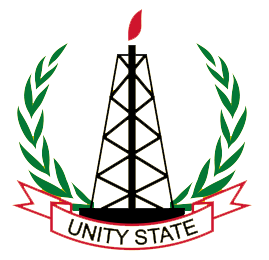
- Flag Seal

- Location in South Sudan (2011–2015 boundaries)
- Coordinates: 09°00′N 29°42′E
- Country: South Sudan
- Region: Greater Upper Nile
- No. of counties: 9
- Capital: Bentiu

Government
  - Type: State
  - Governor: Joseph Monytuil

Area
  - Total: 37,836.39 km^{2} (14,608.71 sq mi)

Population (2014 estimate)
  - Total: 824,700
  - Density: 21.80/km^{2} (56.45/sq mi)
- Time zone: UTC+2 (CAT)
- ISO 3166 code: SS-UY
- HDI (2021): 0.344 low · 7th of 10

Unity State is a state in South Sudan. Unity State is in the Greater Upper Nile region. Unity is inhabited predominantly by two ethnic groups: the Nuer, and the Dinka.

In 2015, a presidential decree established a new system of 28 states, replacing the previously established 10. Unity State was replaced by the states of Ruweng, Northern Liech and Southern Liech. Unity State was re-established by a peace agreement signed on 22 February 2020 with smaller boundaries as the northern part of the former state became the Ruweng Administrative Area.

== Administrative divisions ==
The capital of Unity state is Bentiu. Before an administrative reorganization in 1994, Unity was part of a much larger province of Upper Nile, and the state was sometimes called Western Upper Nile.

The counties of Unity are:

- Guit County
- Koch County
- Leer County
- Mayiandit County
- Mayom County
- Panyijar County
- Rubkona County

Large towns in Unity include Bentiu, Mayom, Rubkona and Leer.

Other towns include,Guit, Riangnom, Rub-Koni, Yoahnyang, Tam, Mankien, Wang-Kay, Koch, Nyal and Ganyliel.

== Economy ==
Agriculture is the state's primary economic activity. Many people of the state are nomadic agro-pastoralists who engage in both agriculture and rearing of livestock, especially cattle. Farming is primarily conducted during the rainy season, although some cultivation also occurs during summer. Vegetables are not widely cultivated, as most farmers are rural rather than urban, and therefore lack access to markets for their produce. Some NGOs have introduced farmers to the practice of cultivation for market.

== Oil fields ==
Southern Sudan's first oil reserves were discovered in the area during the 1970s. The international oil companies which engaged in oil exploration contributed to the massive displacement of the indigenous population.

Oilfields in the state include the Unity oilfield and most of Block 5A. The Unity oilfield is within the largest hydrocarbon accumulation in the Muglad rift basin and contains an estimated 150,000,000 barrels (24,000,000 m^{3}) of oil.

The Greater Nile Oil Pipeline begins in the Unity oilfield.

== See also ==
- 2007 Sudan floods
- Greater Nile Oil Pipeline
