= Upper Nile (state) =

State of South Sudan

- State
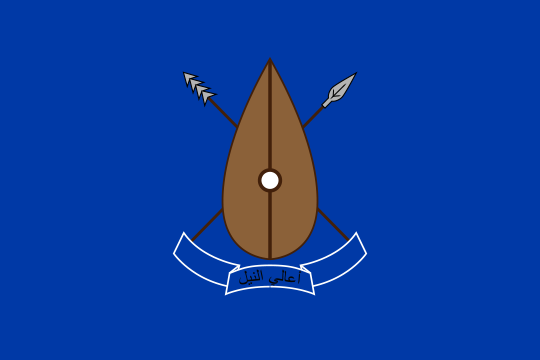
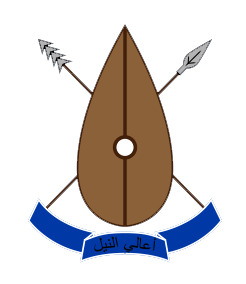
- Flag Coat of arms

- Location in South Sudan.
- Coordinates: 09°46′N 32°44′E
- Country: South Sudan
- Region: Greater Upper Nile
- Capital: Malakal

Government
  - Governor: James Koang Chuol

Area
  - Total: 77,823.42 km^{2} (30,047.79 sq mi)

Population (2017 estimate)
  - Total: 1,385,478
  - Density: 17.80284/km^{2} (46.10915/sq mi)
- Time zone: UTC+2 (CAT)
- ISO 3166 code: SS-NU
- HDI (2021): 0.426 low · 3rd of 10

Upper Nile is a state in South Sudan. The White Nile flows through the state, giving it its name. The state also shares a similar name with the region of Greater Upper Nile, of which it was part along with the states of Unity and Jonglei. It had an area of 77,823 square kilometres (30,048 sq mi). Malakal was the capital of the state. The towns of Upper Nile State include Akoka, Melut, Renk, Kodok along with its numerous counties such as Ulang County, Maiwut County and Nasir County. The Greater Upper Nile is the location of the Fashoda Incident that ended the "Scramble for Africa", and is located in the historical state of Upper Nile. The Upper Nile State seceded from Sudan as part of the Republic of South Sudan on 9 July 2011.

In October 2015, the states of South Sudan were reorganized into 28 states by President Salva Kiir. This was reversed as the result of a peace agreement signed on 22 February 2020.

In South Sudan it is the lowest portion of the Nile.

== Counties ==
Upper Nile is subdivided into 13 counties:

- Akoka County
- Fashoda County
- Longechuk County
- Maban County
- Malakal County
- Manyo County
- Maiwut County
- Melut County
- Nasir County
- Panyikang County
- Renk County
- Ulang County
- Baliet County

== See also ==
- 2007 Sudan floods
