= Greater Upper Nile =

Greater Upper Nile منطقة أعالي النيل
- Region
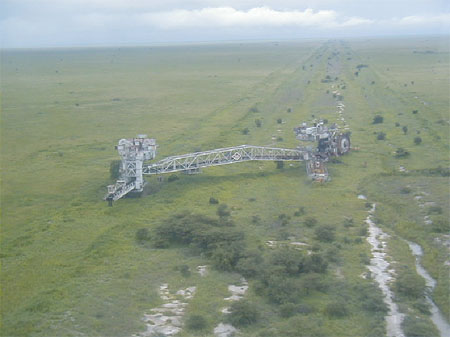
- South Sudan Lucy digger.

- Location in South Sudan.
- Coordinates: 10°30′N 32°30′E
- Country: South Sudan
- Region: Greater Upper Nile
- Capital: Malakal

Area
  - Total: 236,208 km^{2} (91,200 sq mi)

Population (2014 Estimate)
  - Total: 4,119,700
  - Density: 17.441/km^{2} (45.172/sq mi)
- Time zone: UTC+2 (CAT)

The Greater Upper Nile (Arabic: منطقة أعالي النيل, romanized: A'Ali An Nil) is a region of northeastern South Sudan. It is named for the White Nile (it is its lowest portion in South Sudan), a tributary of the Nile River in North and East Africa.

== History ==
The Greater Upper Nile region seceded from the Republic of Sudan on 9 July 2011 along with its fellow Southern Sudanese regions of Bahr el Ghazal and Equatoria. The three regions now constitute the Republic of South Sudan.

== Geography ==
The Greater Upper Nile borders Ethiopia to the east and the Republic of Sudan to the north. The South Sudanese region of Bahr el Ghazal lies to the west and the region of Equatoria lies to the South of Greater Upper Nile.

=== Administrative divisions ===
The Greater Upper Nile consists of the following states:

- Jonglei State
- Unity
- Upper Nile
- Pibor Administrative Area
- Ruweng Administrative Area

Between October 2015 and February 2020, the region consisted of the following states:

- Akobo State
- Bieh State
- Boma State
- Fangak State
- Jonglei State
- Northern Liech State
- Ruweng State
- Southern Liech State
- Central Upper Nile State
- Fashoda State
- Latjor State
- Maiwut State
- Northern Upper Nile State

== See also ==
- White Nile
