= South Sudanese pre-transitional period (2018–2020) =

Period of government formation in South Sudan

The pre-transitional period in South Sudan began with the signing of the Revitalized Agreement on the Resolution of the Conflict in the Republic of South Sudan (R-ARCSS) on 12 September 2018 and ended with the formation of the Revitalized Transitional Government of National Unity (RTGoNU) on 22 February 2020, when four of the five vice presidents were sworn into office. (Note: The final vice president, Hussein Abdelbagi, was sworn in the following day.) The R-ARCSS, which ended the South Sudanese Civil War, specified that the pre-transitional period would have a duration of eight months; however, the period was extended twice—a six-month extension followed by a 100-day extension—due to a lack of implementation of the specified preparations.

The major focus of the period was on the R-ARCSS-required creation of the Necessary Unified Forces (NUF), a national army formed by the integration of the warring parties, principally the South Sudan People's Defence Forces (SSPDF) (Note: Formerly known as the Sudan People's Liberation Army (SPLA), the SSPDF was renamed ten days before the signing of the R-ARCSS and the start of the pre-transitional period.) and the Sudan People's Liberation Army-in-Opposition (SPLA-IO). Several violent incidents occurred during the period—the most notable being an insurgency by Thomas Cirillo's National Salvation Front (NAS), which was not party to the peace agreement.

On 15 February 2020, shortly before the scheduled formation of the RTGoNU, President Salva Kiir announced that the country would return to 10 states with the creation of two administrative areas—the Greater Pibor Administrative Area and the Ruweng Administrative Area—resolving a major point of contention between the government and the opposition movements.

== Signing of the R-ARCSS ==
On 12 September 2018, the Revitalized Agreement on the Resolution of the Conflict in the Republic of South Sudan (R-ARCSS) was signed by the major participants of the South Sudanese Civil War. The agreement was mediated by the Intergovernmental Authority on Development (IGAD) and was seen as a continuation of the failed Agreement on the Resolution of the Conflict in the Republic of South Sudan (ARCSS) signed in 2015. The five parties to the agreement were:

- the government of South Sudan, represented by the South Sudan People's Defence Forces (SSPDF),
- the Sudan People's Liberation Movement/Army-in-Opposition (SPLM/A-IO), whose formation in 2013 led to the civil war,
- the South Sudan Opposition Alliance (SSOA), a coalition of nine rebel groups—although not all groups were party to the agreement,
- Former Detainees (FD), representing 11 SPLM politicians who were arrested at the outbreak of the civil war in 2013,
- Other Political Parties (OPP), a coalition of six minor political parties not represented by the government.

External Link
- Revitalized Agreement on the Resolution of the Conflict in the Republic of South Sudan

== Creation of the Necessary Unified Forces (NUF) ==
A key component of the pre-transitional period was the integration of participating armed groups into a national army. The R-ARCSS specified that cantonment of all forces would take place within 45 days of the signing of the agreement, and that the training and redeployment of the integrated, 83,000-strong Necessary Unified Forces (NUF) would occur within eight months. However, this timeline was delayed for several reasons, including the unwillingness of the government to canton its forces and the efforts of all parties to recruit more troops. Parties inflated their troop numbers to try to gain a greater share of the NUF, as well as DDR packages for excess troops. The SSPDF claimed to have 120,000 troops, the SPLA-IO claimed to have 227,000 troops, and the SSOA claimed to have 126,000 troops, while ceasefire monitors estimated the numbers at 90,000, 30,000, and 1,000 to 5,000, respectively. This led to widespread recruitment and conscription drives, including the forced recruitment of child soldiers.

Machar ordered SPLA-IO to begin the cantonment process in December 2018. The SPLA-IO repeatedly complained about the lack of food, water, shelter, and medical supplies in the camps. The training of the NUF was not completed during the pre-transitional period; by April 2020, only half of the 83,000 specified troops were at training centers. The first batch of 20,000 members of the NUF did not graduate from training until 30 August 2022.

== Conflicts during the pre-transitional period ==
=== Wau clashes (2018–2019) ===
After the signing of the R-ARCSS, scattered clashes continued in Wau State between the SSPDF and Fertit militias aligned with the SPLA-IO, with the SSPDF capturing areas around Baggari (southwest of Wau) from the SPLA-IO. On 29 January 2019, SSPDF commander Joshua Konyi stated that the forces had agreed to implement the peace agreement.

=== NAS insurgency (2018–2020) ===
Several groups broke from the SSOA over the signing of the R-ARCSS and continued to oppose the government, the principal among them being the National Salvation Front (NAS) led by Thomas Cirillo. These groups formed the South Sudan National Democratic Alliance (SSNDA). The SSNDA merged with two other groups that were not party to the R-ARCSS—the SS-UF/A and the Real-SPLA—to form the South Sudan Opposition Movements Alliance (SSOMA) on 30 August 2019.

The majority of fighting occurred between NAS and government forces in the Equatoria region (specifically focused on Central Equatoria), as NAS was the only member of the SSOMA to "exhibit any clear military capacity on the ground". On 12 January 2020, the SSOMA signed a ceasefire with the government negotiated by the Community of Sant'Egidio. NAS clashes with the SSPDF and SPLA-IO resumed in April 2020.

=== Maiwut clashes (2019) ===
2019 Maiwut clashes
Date	31 July 2019 – 6 August 2019 (6 days)
Location	Maiwut, Maiwut State

Belligerents
(South Sudan) SPLM-IO: SPLA-IO Division 5	(South Sudan) SPLM-IO: Forces loyal to Ochan; Supported by: SSPDF

Commanders and leaders
James Khor Chol	James Ochan Puot

Casualties and losses
- 7 killed 10,000 displaced

During the civil war, Maiwut, a strategic town near the border with Ethiopia, was contested between the SPLA-IO and a pro-government faction of the SPLA-IO led by Taban Deng Gai. In 2017, the deployment of an SPLA-IO force commanded by James Ochan Puot led to the capture of Maiwut from the government. A native of the area, Ochan was able to gain significant local support and resources, leading to tensions with the commander of SPLA-IO Division 5, James Khor Chol. Tensions escalated, and on 31 July 2019, Chol launched an attack on Maiwut with forces from Turow, Jekou, and Lolnyang, which succeeded in taking the town the following day. With SSPDF support and supplies, Ochan retook Maiwut on 6 August 2019. Ochan's forces then proceeded to burn the SPLA-IO cantonment site at Turow. On 22 September 2019, Ochan formally defected to the SSPDF.

== Parties, factions, and splits ==
=== SSOA splits ===
The South Sudan Opposition Alliance (SSOA) split over the signing of the R-ARCSS, with the National Salvation Front led by Thomas Cirillo and several breakaway movements claiming that the agreement was a "power sharing agreement between elites and for the elites". The remaining members of the SSOA split into two factions after contested elections on 30 November 2018, but the dispute was resolved in May 2019 with Denay Jock Chagor becoming chair.

=== List of groups during the pre-transitional period ===
The following is a list of political or military groups in South Sudan during the pre-transitional period, including major positions awarded upon the formation of the Revitalized Transitional Government of National Unity (RTGoNU):

Name	Leader	Party to the R-ARCSS	Major Positions in the RTGoNU
Sudan People's Liberation Movement (SPLM) / South Sudan People's Defence Forces (SSPDF)	Salva Kiir	Yes	President (Salva Kiir); Second Vice President (James Wani Igga); Third Vice President (Taban Deng Gai); Governor of Central Equatoria (Emmanuel Adil Anthony); Governor of Eastern Equatoria (Louis Lobong Lojore); Governor of Lakes State (Makur Kulang Liei); Governor of Northern Bahr el Ghazal (Tong Aken Ngor); Governor of Unity State (Joseph Monytuil); Governor of Warrap State (Bona Panek Biar); Chief Administrator of Abyei (Kuol Deim Kuol); Chief Administrator of the Greater Pibor Administrative Area (Joshua Konyi); Chief Administrator of the Ruweng Administrative Area (William Chol Awolich)
Sudan People's Liberation Movement/Army-in-Opposition (SPLM/A-IO)	Riek Machar	Yes	First Vice President (Riek Machar); Governor of Upper Nile State (Budhok Ayang Anei Kur); Governor of Western Bahr el Ghazal (Sarah Cleto Hassan); Governor of Western Equatoria (Alfred Futiyo Karaba)
Federal Democratic Party/South Sudan Armed Forces (FDP/SSAF)	Gabriel Changson Chang	Yes (as part of the SSOA)	
National Democratic Movement (NDM)	Lam Akol	Yes (as part of the SSOA)	
South Sudan National Movement for Change (SSNMC)	Joseph Bakosoro	Yes (as part of the SSOA)	
South Sudan Patriotic Movement/Army (SSPM/A)	Costello Garang Ring Lual	Yes (as part of the SSOA)	Fifth Vice President (Hussein Abdelbagi)
South Sudan Liberation Movement/Army (SSLM/A)	Bapiny Monytuil Wicjang Wuor	Yes (as part of the SSOA)	
South Sudan United Movement/Army (SSUM/A)	Denay Jock Chagor	Yes (as part of the SSOA)	Governor of Jonglei State (Denay Jock Chagor)
National Salvation Front [Khalid Boutrous] (NAS-KB)	Khalid Boutrous Bora	Yes (as part of the SSOA)	
Former Detainees (FD or SPLM-FD)	Pagan Amum (until May 2019) Deng Alor Kuol	Yes	Fourth Vice President (Rebecca Nyandeng De Mabior)
Umbrella of Political Parties	Peter Mayen	Yes (as part of OPP)	
National Alliance of Political Parties	Kornelio Kon Ngu	Yes (as part of OPP)	
United Sudan African Party (USAF)	Joseph Ukel Abango	Yes (as part of OPP)	
United Democratic Salvation Front	Peter Martin Toko Moyi	Yes (as part of OPP)	
United Democratic Party	Steward Sorobo Budia	Yes (as part of OPP)	
African National Congress (ANC)	Wilson Lionding Sabit	Yes (as part of OPP)	
South Sudan United Front/Army (SS-UF/A)	Paul Malong Awan	No	
National Salvation Front (NAS)	Thomas Cirillo	No (broke from the SSOA on 14 September 2018)	
People's Democratic Movement (PDM)	Hakim Dario	No (broke from the SSOA on 14 September 2018)	
United Democratic Republican Alliance (UDRA)	Gatweth K. Thich	No (broke from the SSOA on 14 September 2018)	
National Democratic Movement-Patriotic Front (NDM-PF)	Emmanuel Ajawin	No (split from the NDM and broke from the SSOA on 14 September 2018)	
People's Democratic Movement for Peace (PDM-P)	Josephine Joseph Lagu	Yes (split from PDM on 28 September 2018; joined the SSOA)	
Equatoria Non-Allied Forces (ENAF) (Note: ENAF split from NAS in 2018 before the signing of the R-ARCSS.)	Moses Yanga Yoana	Yes (signed a peace deal on 18 February 2019)	
Real-SPLM (R-SPLM)	Pagan Amum	No (split from FD, created 30 August 2019)	
