= 2014 retreat from Western Bahr el Ghazal =

Withdrawal in South Sudan

- Part of the South Sudanese Civil War, and the ethnic violence in South Sudan
Date	25 April – 4 August 2014 (3 months, 1 week and 3 days)
Location	Western and Northern Bahr el Ghazal, South Sudan
Result	500+ deserters reach Sudan; Some deserters join rebels; Hundreds of deserters surrender

Belligerents
South Sudan: SPLA	Nuer SPLA deserters (South Sudan) SPLM-IO

Commanders and leaders
(South Sudan) Brig. Gen. Bak Akoon Bak (Mechanized Division) (South Sudan) Kuel Aguer Kuel (Northern Bahr el Ghazal governor) (South Sudan) Rizig Zachariah Hassan (Western Bahr el Ghazal governor)	Brig Gen. Gatwech Gach Makuach; Brig Gen. James Ochan Puot; Brig Gen. Kuang Cirang (surrendered); Brig Gen. Kuol Tap; Brig. Gen. Peter Gatbel (surrendered); One unidentified Nuer brigadier general

Units involved
SPLA: 3rd Division; 5th (Mechanized) Division; Lakes State reinforcements	Several groups

Strength
Thousands	Disputed; at least several hundreds

Casualties and losses
Many killed	Hundreds killed, hundreds surrendered
- Thousands of civilians displaced

The 2014 retreat from Western Bahr el Ghazal, also called the long march north, was an unorganized withdrawal by hundreds of Nuer Sudan People's Liberation Army (SPLA) deserters who sought to flee from Bahr el Ghazal to Sudan during the South Sudanese Civil War. After longstanding tensions between SPLA soldiers belonging to the Dinka and Nuer ethnic groups escalated on 25 April 2014, leading to a massacre of Nuer soldiers at Mapel in Western Bahr el Ghazal, a large number of Nuer SPLA soldiers deserted to escape ethnic prosecution and loyalist SPLA forces. Though some deserters joined SPLM-IO rebels or surrendered to the government, a large number of them marched northward, joined by other SPLA defectors from Northern Bahr el Ghazal. After covering over 400 kilometres (250 mi), this trek eventually arrived in Sudan on 4 August 2014, where they were disarmed.

== Background ==
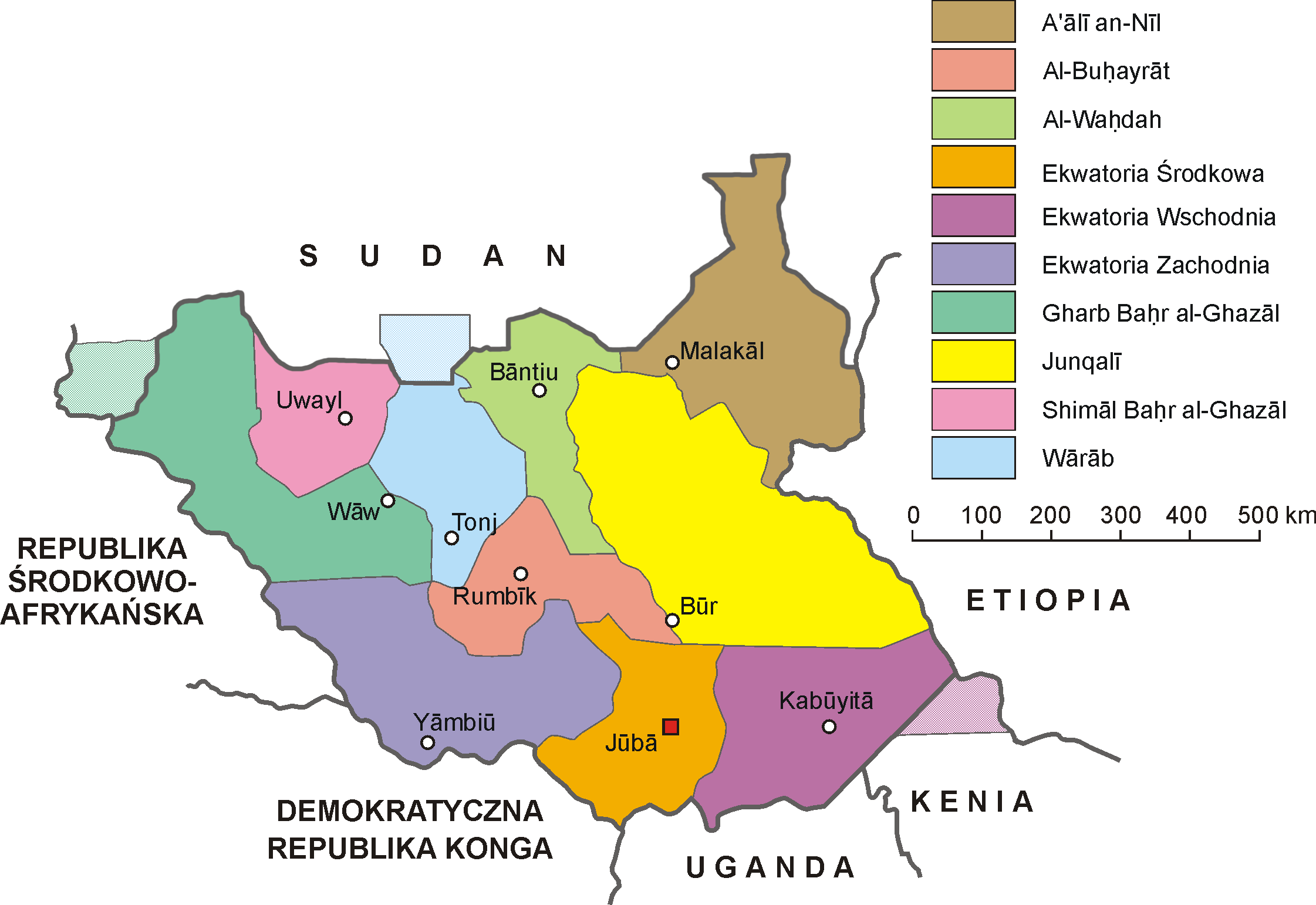
States of South Sudan in 2014, with Western Bahr el Ghazal in dark green and Northern Bahr el Ghazal in pink

Following the outbreak of the South Sudanese Civil War between the followers of President Salva Kiir and Vice President Riek Machar's SPLM-IO rebels in late 2013, Bahr el Ghazal had remained mostly peaceful. The area had served as stronghold of the pro-Kiir Sudan People's Liberation Army (SPLA) during the Second Sudanese Civil War, while its population mostly consisted of Dinka people who generally supported the government. Machar's forces consequently had little political influence in Bahr el Ghazal. A local Fertit militia which had waged an insurgency against the government since 2012 allied with the SPLM-IO, but its actual military strength was negligible.

The security situation in the region began to deteriorate, however, when Kiir replaced SPLA Chief of the General Staff James Hoth Mai, an ethnic Nuer, with Paul Malong Awan, a Dinka, in April 2014. This move caused unrest among Nuer soldiers of the SPLA, who believed that members of their ethnic group were sidelined in the military. Furthermore, Malong had previously served as governor of Northern Bahr el Ghazal where his authoritarian rule had provided stability. By contrast, his successor as governor, Kuel Aguer Kuel, was "widely seen as ill suited to governing the state in a time of political and military crisis", and instability subsequently grew in Northern Bahr el Ghazal. Furthermore, ethnic tensions in the region heightened when it became known that Nuer rebels had committed a major massacre against Dinka civilians and soldiers in Bentiu. Some of the victims had families in Bahr el Ghazal, contributing the animosity of locals against ethnic Nuer.

== History ==
=== Mapel massacre ===
The ethnic tensions gave way to violence on 25 April, when a group of Dinkas attacked an unarmed Nuer trainee of the SPLA on the market of Mapel, a town which hosted a SPLA training centre and served as the headquarters for the SPLA's 5th Division. The incident was reportedly the result of an altercation between the soldier and his superior which escalated when the families of Dinka soldiers who had been killed in Bentiu and Bor intervened. The initial clashes between Nuer trainees and Dinka civilians quickly spread to Mapel's training centre, where Dinka soldiers attacked their Nuer comrades.

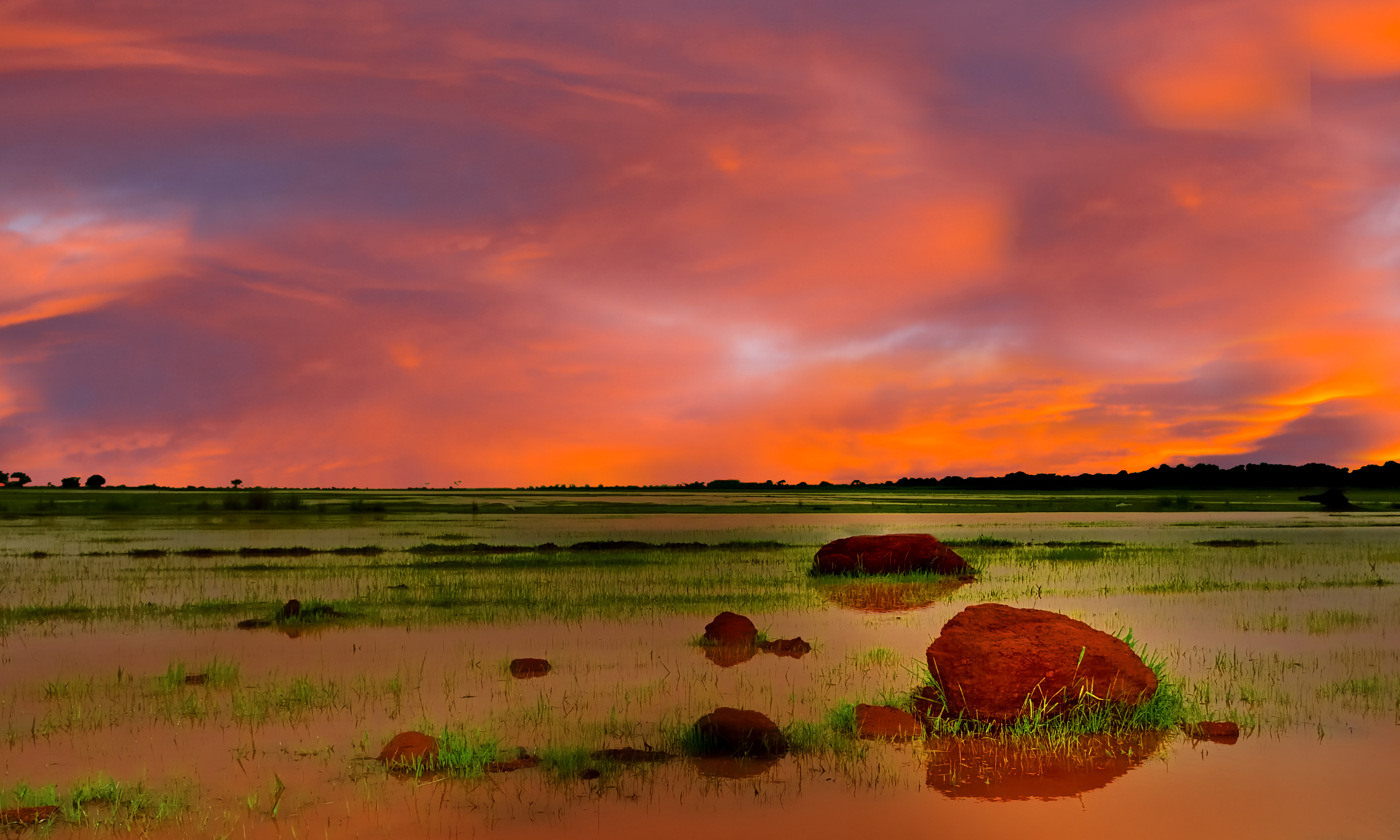
Wetlands of the Jur River in southern Western Bahr el Ghazal. The deserters fled into the region's wilderness after the massacre at Mapel.

How many Nuer recruits were killed during the clashes at the training centre is disputed. Government representatives claimed that only three or four were killed, and that the Nuer soldiers had actually planned an uprising or caused the escalation of violence by deserting. Nuer survivors of the fighting and the SPLM-IO, however, later reported that Dinka troops led by the 5th Division's commander Bak Akoon Bak had shot "about 200 Nuer soldiers in cold blood", causing the rest to flee into the bush for their lives. Independent sources lent more credibility to the version told by Nuer deserters, though disagreed on how many had died, ranging from about 40 to 150. Between 100 and 500 Nuer SPLA soldiers managed to leave the town. Some joined local SPLM-IO insurgents while the others simply tried to hide from the Dinka.

Many civilians and their families fled from Mapel during and after the clashes, relocating to Wau town and Baggari District. These displaced people, alongside refugees from other regions of South Sudan, often arrived in poor health and reduced local food availability, causing concerns about the spread of malnutrition in Wau County.

=== Mutiny at Wau ===
News of what had happened at Mapel soon reached Wau town, capital of Western Bahr el Ghazal and site of another SPLA base. Nuer soldiers stationed there had not been paid for months and had already been suspected of rebel sympathies. The rumours about a massacre in Mapel further heightened the existing tensions. Several groups of Nuer soldiers mutinied on late 26 April, whereupon heavy clashes broke out between government loyalists and the mutineers. Some of the Nuer troopers and about 500 Nuer civilians tried to take refuge at the local UNMISS base, but were attacked by government loyalists while doing so. Other mutineers reportedly attacked Wau Airport, but were driven off. A disputed number of fighters were killed in these clashes.

By evening, "at least 61" Nuer soldiers were retreating from the town toward the west, with loyalist forces in pursuit. The deserters were led by four brigadier generals, namely Brig. Gen. Gatwech Gach Makuach, Brig. Gen. James Ochan Puot, Brig Gen. Kuang Cirang, and one unidentified officer, who had joined the mutiny out of fear for their lives and to protest against the massacre at Mapel. Western Bahr el Ghazal governor Rizig Zachariah ordered his pursuing forces not to kill the deserters, but to surround them and force them to surrender. Despite this, locals reported heavy fighting between deserters and the SPLA at Busseri near Wau on 27 April, causing about 4,000 locals to flee the area.

Following the end of combat at Wau, about 700 Nuer civilians sought protection at Wau's UNMISS base; most of them were family members of the deserted soldiers, while others were students. Some of those who had found shelter at the base claimed that UNMISS had turned away some refugees, though UNMISS representatives denied this.

=== March north and further desertions ===
A small number of the deserters from Mapel and Wau, most notably Gatwech Gach Makuach and James Ochan Puot, joined the local rebel forces, but most had been motivated in their desertion by fear of ethnic persecution rather than an actual desire to rebel. A substantial number of the deserters were not even armed. The government consequently managed to convince elements of the Nuer forces to surrender: Seven deserters from Wau, including Brig Gen. Kuang Cirang, rejoined the SPLA on 28 April, while 255 soldiers from Mapel reportedly returned to their base by 11 July.

Hundreds of other Nuer soldiers from Mapel and Wau, however, opted to march north to escape the SPLA. As the deserters entered areas, clashes and insecurity ensued as they raided villages for supplies and food while the government tried to stop them. Instability often remained high even after the fighters had left an area. By late June, fighting took place at Baggari between the deserters and SPLA forces which had received reinforcements from Lakes State. About 1,500 civilians had been displaced around Wau by 7 July, while the Nuer soldiers moved through Farajallah in the west. Attempts by the SPLA to stop the trek failed.

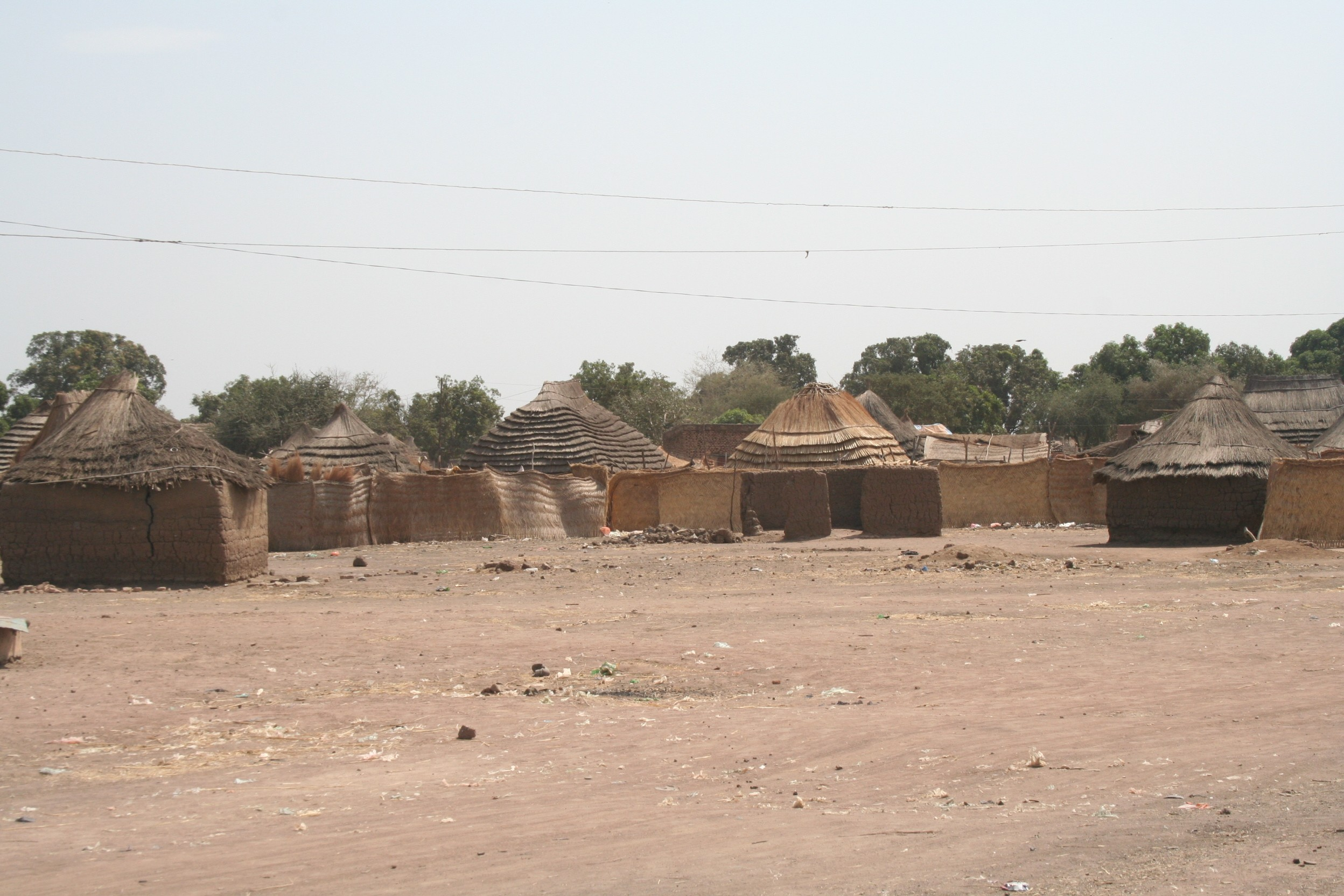
The deserters plundered villages (example pictured) around Aweil to sustain themselves.

The deserters crossed the border from Western to Northern Bahr el Ghazal sometime in early July, and raided a medical clinic in Awada District on 11 July. Meanwhile, the SPLA mobilized its forces in the area to stop the deserters, causing clashes between the two sides at Moiny on 14 July. The deserters broke through, and raided Mayom Akueng on the next day as they travelled further north. Heavy fighting again took place from 15 to 18 July, as the SPLA attempted to block the trek at Gotbulo. Despite this, the deserters continued their march, and were joined by other deserters as they went on. Elements of the 3rd Division in Wunyik and Majok Yiiththiou, led by brigadier generals Peter Gatbel and Kuol Tap respectively, deserted in late April, and joined the forces from Wau and Mapel. As result of disagreements with other leaders of the deserters, Gatbel and his followers surrendered to the government soon after.

Over 500 Nuer deserters eventually crossed the border to East Darfur, Sudan, at Hadida on 4 August. They had travelled over 400 kilometres (250 mi). After arriving in Sudan, the deserters were disarmed by the Sudanese Armed Forces. It is unclear why the Nuer soldiers had travelled all the way to Sudan; the Small Arms Survey theorized that they either wanted to seek protection from the SPLA and ethnic persecution, or planned to join the SPLM-IO rebels of Dau Aturjong who had defected from the government in late May. His base was believed to be close to the Sudanese border.

== Aftermath ==
The massacre at Mapel, the desertions of Nuer soldiers, and the destruction that had resulted from the fighting between SPLA and Nuer forces destabilized Bahr el Ghazal. By September 2014, thousands remained displaced in the area around Wau due to the insecurity that the Long March had caused there. Furthermore, the SPLM-IO which had previously been mostly powerless in the region received a major boost due to these events, and its activity consequently increased in Bahr el Ghazal. The local government also lost trust due to its handling of the crises. All of this contributed to the "more general trend in South Sudan towards fragmentation as each region looks to its own interests". Growing ethnic tensions eventually led to the outbreak of major insurgencies in Bahr el Ghazal, such as Maj. Gen. Thomas Bazylio Tandro's campaign in 2015, the 2016–18 Wau clashes and the South Sudan Patriotic Army's rebellion since 2017.

== Bibliography ==
- PSI South Sudan; Western Bahr el Ghazal State Ministry of Health; Wau County Health Department; Western Bahr el Ghazal Relief and Rehabilitation Commission (2014). Pre-Harvest Anthropometric and Mortality Survey. Wau County, Western Bahr El Ghazal, South Sudan (PDF). Washington, D.C.: Population Services International.
- Timeline of Recent Intra-Southern Conflict (PDF). Geneva: Small Arms Survey. 27 June 2014.
- The Conflict in Northern and Western Bahrel Ghazal States (PDF). Geneva: Small Arms Survey. 16 October 2014.
- Young, John (2015). A Fractious Rebellion: Inside the SPLM-IO (PDF). Geneva: Small Arms Survey. ISBN 978-2-940548-17-0.
