= Ministry of Agriculture and Food Security (South Sudan) =

Government ministry of South Sudan

South Sudan Ministry of Agriculture and Food Security
Department overview
- Formed: 2011
- Jurisdiction: South Sudan
- Headquarters: Juba
- Minister responsible: Clement Juma Mbugoniwia, Minister of Agriculture and Food Security

The Ministry of Agriculture and Food Security in South Sudan is a ministry in the current Revitalised Transitional Government of National Unity. The sitting minister is Josephine Joseph Lagu, daughter of veteran politician, Joseph Lagu; while Lily Albino Akol Akol serves as the deputy Minister of Agriculture and Food Security

== List of ministers of agriculture and food security ==
No.	Name	Office		President	Party
1	Betty Ogwaro	2011	2014	Salva Kiir	Sudan People's Liberation Movement
2	Josephine Joseph Lagu	2014	2014	Salva Kiir	Sudan People's Liberation Movement
3	Beda Machar Deng	2014	2014	Salva Kiir	Sudan People's Liberation Movement
4	Betty Ogwaro	2014	2015	Salva Kiir	Sudan People's Liberation Movement
5	Beda Machar Deng	2015	2016	Salva Kiir	Sudan People's Liberation Movement
6	Josephine Joseph Lagu	2016	2016	Salva Kiir	Sudan People's Liberation Movement
7	Betty Ogwaro	2016	2019	Salva Kiir	Sudan People's Liberation Movement
8	Josephine Joseph Lagu	2020	2025	Salva Kiir	Sudan People's Liberation Movement
9	Hussein Abdelbagi	2025	2026	Salva Kiir	South Sudan Opposition Alliance
10	Clement Juma Mbugoniwia	2026	Present	Salva Kiir	South Sudan Opposition Alliance
