= List of political parties in South Sudan =

This article lists political parties in South Sudan.

== Parties represented in the Transitional National Legislative Assembly ==
Party	Abbr.	Council of States seats	National Legislative Assembly seats
Sudan People's Liberation Movement	SPLM	46 / 100	332 / 550
Sudan People's Liberation Movement-in-Opposition	SPLM-IO	27 / 100	128 / 550
South Sudan Opposition Alliance	SSOA	10 / 100	50 / 550
Democratic Forum		2 / 100	
United South Sudan African Party	USSAP	2 / 100	
Labour Party	LPSS	1 / 100	
Democratic Change	DC	1 / 100	
United South Sudan Party	USSP	1 / 100	
Sudan African National Union	SANU	1 / 100	
United Democratic Salvation Front	USDF	1 / 100	

== Parties not represented in the Transitional National Legislative Assembly ==
- Communist Party of South Sudan
- Freedom Democratic Party
- Hope and Salvation Front/Army
- Kush Democratic Majority Party
- People’s United Forum
- South Sudan African National Congress
- South Sudan Liberal Party
- South Sudan Permanent Peace Movement
- South Sudan United Front
- United Democratic Front

== Defunct parties ==
- African People's Progressive Alliance

== See also ==
- Politics of South Sudan
- List of political parties by country
