= Pagak offensive =

- Part of South Sudanese Civil War
- Most of the offensive took place in southern Latjoor (red), though other places such as Mathiang were also affected.
Date	1 July – 25 August 2017 (1 month, 3 weeks and 3 days)
Location	Northeastern Greater Upper Nile, South Sudan
Result	Partial government victory
Territorial changes	Pagak captured by SPLA, though surrounding areas remain unsafe or under rebel control

Belligerents
(South Sudan) SPLM government: SPLM-IO (Juba faction); Rebel claims: Uganda; JEM; SPLM-N	(South Sudan) SPLM-IO rebels loyal to Riek Machar

Commanders and leaders
(South Sudan) Taban Deng Gai (First Vice President) (South Sudan) Maj. Gen. Bol Ruach Rom (Governor of Maiwut County) (South Sudan) Gen. Justin Nhial Batoang (6th Division commander) (South Sudan) Brig. Gen. Mun Gach Thoch (SPLM-IO Juba faction commander) (South Sudan) Brig. Gen. Lual Dak Gatkek (SPLM-IO Juba faction commander)	(South Sudan) Maj. Gen. Khor Chuol Giet (5th Division chief commander) (South Sudan) Maj. Gen. James Ochan Puot (Special Brigade Two commander) (South Sudan) Maj. Gen. Peter Lim Bol (Sector 4 deputy commander) (South Sudan) Maj. Tut Rom (surrendered) (Jotome County commissioner)

Units involved
SPLA: Units loyal to Taban Deng Gai; 6th Division; Units from Paloch; (Uganda) UPDF (rebel claim)	SPLM/A-IO: 5th Division; Sector 4; Tiger Battalion; Special Brigade Two

Strength
6,000 (rebel claim)	Unknown

Casualties and losses
Heavy (rebel claim)	Unknown
- Tens of thousands displaced

The Pagak offensive was a major military operation by the South Sudanese government during the South Sudanese Civil War with the aim of capturing the strategic town of Pagak and the wider Maiwut County from Riek Machar's SPLM-IO rebels. Since the civil war's beginning, Pagak had served as headquarters and stronghold for the rebels, and its loss was believed to possibly greatly weaken the insurgency. A large part of the government forces that took part in the offensive are members of the SPLM-IO (Juba faction), a break-away group from Machar's movement that is loyal to First Vice President Taban Deng Gai. Though pro-government forces managed to capture Pagak on 6 August, their attempts to secure the surrounding areas proved unsuccessful. As result, the SPLA-held corridor between Mathiang and Pagak remained unsafe.

== History ==
=== Government offensive ===
According to rebel officials, the government offensive began around 1 July 2017, as SPLA soldiers and allied "Sudanese rebels" reportedly launched "surprise attacks" on positions of Machar loyalists in and around Mathiang and Guelguk, Longechuk County; the rebels claimed that these initial assaults and others in the surrounding countryside were easily repulsed. SPLM-IO military intelligence officer Khamis Mawwil threatened that "there will be a river of body bags if they think they can take over our areas in Upper Nile". The situation changed, however, as fighters loyal to Taban Deng Gai joined the operations against Machar's followers. By 10 July, these militiamen had captured Mathiang and numerous towns and villages in Longechuk County from the rebels. The fighting led the United Nations to evacuate at least 25 aid workers from the SPLA-IO stronghold of Pagak, while thousands of civilians were displaced and around 50,000 cut off from aid. Meanwhile, the government denied that it was conducting an offensive and said that it was still honoring its unilaterally declared ceasefire.

Despite repeated counter-attacks and heavy resistance, government troops continued to advance on the strategic town of Maiwut, center of Maiwut County, over the following weeks. Around 30,000 civilians fled the fighting and sought shelter at Pagak, while the government continued to deny that any offensive operations were taking place. A SPLA spokesman simply stated that "if Taban Deng’s forces are moving to Pagak it is their responsibility". The rebels also claimed that the Uganda People's Defence Force supported the government during the offensive with air strikes.

On 27 July, the rebel-held town of Maiwut, near the border with Ethiopia, was eventually captured by SPLA troops, consisting mainly of forces loyal to Vice-President Taban Deng Gai. Maiwut is located along the supply route between the Ethiopian border and Mathiang. Only after this victory did the government admit that it had launched an offensive, though it was now framed as "self-defense" in order to prevent constant rebel attacks on government-held areas. With the fall of Maiwut, the SPLM-IO (Juba faction) called on refugees to return to their homes in Maiwut County, while the SPLA began to besiege nearby Pagak. The first attacks on the rebel stronghold failed, but as more and more SPLA troops arrived with heavy artillery, the situation of the besieged SPLM-IO garrison became untenable. The insurgents consequently retreated on late 6 August, allowing the government to occupy Pagak without resistance on the following day. Before their withdrawal, however, the Machar loyalists set fire to their military barracks and ammunition stores so that they would not fall into the hands of the SPLA. The government went on to say that its forces were welcomed by the residents of Pagak who had "been held hostage for almost four years since the conflict erupted" by the rebels; this was however denied by local aid workers, according to whom thousands fled the SPLA soldiers.

=== Rebel counter-offensive ===
On the same day of Pagak's fall, however, the rebels launched their own counter-offensive against Maiwut. Exploiting that most of the garrison had been moved to secure Pagak, the insurgents reportedly retook the town and captured much military equipment; the government however denied that Maiwut had fallen. According to the regional rebel commander Maj. Gen. Khor Chuol Giet, the rebels had effectively cut off the government forces at Pagak and the Ethiopian border.

As the rebels now in turn besieged the government forces in Pagak, they called on the SPLA soldiers to surrender, which they refused to do. Machar's fighters consequently began to attack the town. Between 11 and 15 August heavy fighting raged at the town, with the rebels repeatedly claiming that they had fully retaken it and that the government troops had been reduced to an holdout at the Ethiopian border crossing. The government denied these claims. On 22 August, Machar's SPLM-IO claimed that the government troops had fled into Ethiopia, where they had "barricaded themselves". In response, Governor Bol Ruach told the Sudan Tribune that "maybe they are talking of their own Pagak but the Pagak in which I talk to you is under the full control of the government since I came here." Regardless of who controlled Pagak, fighting in the countryside continued unabated, and prevented the distribution of humanitarian assistance by UN agencies to the civilian population.

By 25 August, a United Nations peacekeeping official confirmed that Pagak was fully under government control; nevertheless, heavy fighting continued in the surrounding areas with the corridor to Mathiang remaining unsafe. Meanwhile, Tut Rom, an "influential" follower of Machar and commissioner of Jotome County in Maiwut defected to Taban Deng Gai. On 30 August, the SPLA claimed that with Pagak under government control, the Palogue oil field was finally secure from rebel attacks.
