= Baliet County =

Ngok(Baliet)County
- County
- Country: South Sudan
- State: Upper Nile State

Population (2017 estimate)
  - Total: 55,073
- Time zone: UTC+2 (CAT)

Baliet is an administrative county in the Upper Nile State, South Sudan. The County headquarters is the town of Baliet (also referred to as Banglai), located on the north side of the Sobat River 20 km south east of Malakal, the capital city of Upper Nile State.

Baliet County, like others in Upper Nile State, was formed in 2006. It was part a previously larger "Sobat County," which also included other simultaneously formed counties of Longechuk, Maban, Malakal, Maiwut, Nasir, and Ulang. In the pre-Comprehensive Peace Agreement period, the counties were considered districts within Sobat County.

== Cultural groups ==
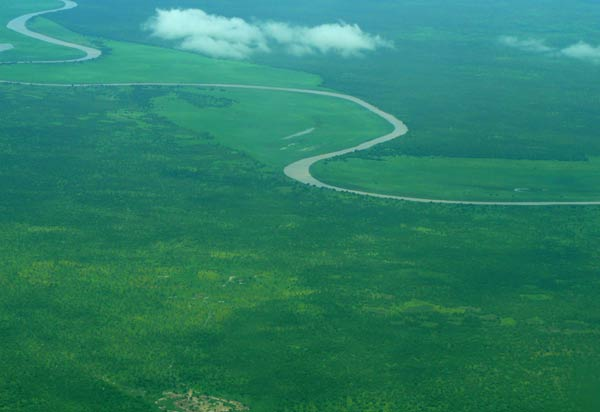
Sobat River in Baliet County

The "Apadang" subtribe of Ngok Lual Yak make up the majority of population of Baliet County. Ngok Lual Yak is made up of 11 clans: Ajuba, Awieer (Awiɛɛr), Adong (Adɔ̈ŋ), Achaak (Acaak), Abii, Baliët, Balak, Duut, Ding (Dïng), Ngaar (Ŋäär) and Dhiaak. These clans are also divided into two major sections; Weny and Yom. The Ngok Lual Yak tribe reside along both sides of Sobat River from Ulang (Wunlaŋ) County to Malakal city.

=== Revival of Dengdit deity ===
People of Ngok Lual Yak tribe pride themselves in their enduring dinka (Jieng) culture and bravery. Central to Ngok Lual Yak spiritual existence was/is the deity called Dengdit. Before the introduction of Christianity in South Sudan, Dengdit, as a Ngok's tribal spiritual deity, was both a symbol of unity among the 11 sections of Ngok tribe and a source of spiritual consolation both in time of calamities and peace. The introduction of Christianity led to the disappearance of Dengdit as a spiritual deity for quiet a period of time. However, after several years of Christian spiritual monopoly, Dengdit was re-manifested in a lady named Awut Ajal from the Adong clan. At first, when she was manifested by the spirit of Dengdit, her family thought she was mentally sick and could not do or take anything she said seriously. Ngok elders who were around at the time recounted that she heard the a sound commanding her, "Awut, go back to "Pan Deng!" Upon hearing the command, she obeyed, and went to Pan Deng, a home containing a shrine to Dengdit. Tribal elders said she did obey and went, only to find out that the spirit led her, apparently, to where the spiritual shrine of Dengdit was originally located. Well known among Ngok spiritual historians and elders, the woman was possessed and did not initially know where she was going; the spirit led her there. She stayed at the shrine for a while, and when she wanted to leave, she was again commanded by the spirit to remain at the shrine as the spirit had chosen her as the new human medium through which the deity wanted to communicate with his followers. The reappearance of Dendit through Awut Ajal was celebrated by the tribal spiritual followers. She was welcomed with jubilation, traditional dance and spiritual chants and offering by the people in town of Wunriang. This, then, initiated the re-establishment of the spiritual house and shrine of Dengdit, locally known as Luang Dengdiit in Wunriang today.

== South Sudan Referendum ==
In a recent Southern Sudan referendum, Baliet County made a historic milestone with the entire registered population voting 100% for separation of the Southern Sudan.

== Government ==
Prior to the peace agreement, the first three commissioners of Baliet County were Kon Deng Michar, Thon Agook, Juac Deng Abur. After the peace agreement the first commissioner of Baliet was Moses Dhieu Kiir, followed by Moses Thon Bol Anyaang. Joseph Maker Diing, Engineer Cok Mareng, followed by Mr. James Tor Monybuny, a Pastor of the Presbyterian Church of South Sudan (PCOSS). James Tor became head of CHORM; he also became the Governor of Central Upper Nile State between January 2017 and June 2019. He was followed by James Monyluk Mijok, then by Thon Deng Malang, Machol Thon Gach and once again, James Monyluk Mijok, Moses Achuil Guek and the current commissioner of Baliet County is Joseph Deng Angau
