= Hope and Salvation Front/Army =

Political party in South Sudan

- Abbreviation: HSF/A
- Leader: Malang Kerubino
- Founded: 26 January 2026
- Split from: South Sudan United Front
- National Legislative Assembly: 0 / 550
- Council of States: 0 / 100

The Hope and Salvation Front/Army (HSF/A) is a political party and insurgent group in South Sudan. The group was founded by Malang Kerubino on 26 January 2026 to challenge the government of Salva Kiir.

== Background ==
The founder of the HSF/A, Malang Kerubino, is the son of Kerubino Kuanyin Bol, a founder of the Sudan People's Liberation Army. Kerubino Kuanyin Bol is said to have fired the first shot of the Second Sudanese Civil War in 1983 and was an influential figure until his death in 1999.

In March 2021, Malang Kerubino was appointed as the Chief of General Staff for the South Sudan United Front (SSUF/A), a rebel group founded in 2018 to fight against the government of Salva Kiir. On 14 January 2026, Malang resigned from the SSUF/A along with 12 other senior members. Malang announced the formation of the HSF/A on 26 January 2026. He stated that the group was formed in a response to unpaid salaries, rising living costs and the failure of state institutions to serve citizens.
