= LPSS =

The acronym LPSS may refer to:

- A US Navy hull classification symbol: Transport submarine (LPSS)
- Lorne Park Secondary School, a high school in Mississauga, Ontario, Canada
- Lambrick Park Secondary School, a high school in Saanich, British Columbia, Canada
- Lafayette Parish School System, a school district in Louisiana
- Lucent Public Safety Systems, a company acquired by Intrado
- Labour Party South Sudan
- Low Power Subsystems, a management class of subsystems in the Linux kernel
