= Santino Deng Wol =

South Sudanese military figure (born 1962)

Santino Deng Wol General

Chief of Defense Forces
- Incumbent
- Assumed office 11 April 2021
- Preceded by: Johnson Juma Okot

Personal details
- Born: 9 November 1962 (age 64)
- Party: Sudan People's Liberation Movement (SPLM)
- Occupation: Military Commander

Santino Deng Wol (born November 9, 1962) is a South Sudanese military figure serving as the chief of defence forces of the South Sudan People's Defence Forces. He served as Lion Division commander from 2007 to 2017 and currently serving as the Assistant Chief of Defence Force for Administration, Finance and Personnel of South Sudanese army, SSPDF after being transferred from the post of Ground Force Commander. His hometown is Udhum which is part of Aweil West County in Northern Bahr el Ghazal.

== Military figure ==
Santino Deng Wol has been a commander of South Sudanese military branch known as "Division 3" or simply "Lion Division" cored in Wunyiek, Aweil East County. He began his military career in the 1960s as a mercenary of the Arabs. During this period, at the head of a small paramilitary unit sent to fight the rebel Anya-Nya group, he wreak the region of Aweil avoc. It was during these actions that his men, on August 23, 1965, would have killed in cold blood the young Combonian missionary Father Barnaba Deng. According to Naranjo and Moschetti, Father Barnaba was targeted by Santino's men due to his stance in defence of local victims of the soldiers' violence.

In 2014 during Nuer ethnic cleansing, Deng Wol carried out many attacks in residential areas of the rebel forces in Bentiu, Bor and Malakal. On 1 July 2015, Deng Wol was listed in United Nation sanctions alongside his fellow South Sudanese war commanders namely Marial Chengdong and Peter Gadet for torching civilians alive in houses, and killing civilians in religious bases. Wol's actions were connected to disruption of an agreed upon peace in the region. On 11 April 2021, Wol was named Chief of Staff of the South Sudan People's Defence Forces.
