= Aguer =

Aguer is a surname. Notable people with the surname include:

- Héctor Aguer (born 1943), Argentine Roman Catholic Archbishop
- Kuel Aguer (born 1958), South Sudanese politician
