= Juba clashes =

PURS may refer to:

- Battle of Juba (2013)
- Battle of Juba (2016)
- 2018 Juba raid
