= Ngok Lual Yak =

African sub-tribe

Ngok Lual Yak is an African sub-tribe of the Dinka group. They are mainly found in Malakal and Baliet County, South Sudan and inhabit the land along the Sobat. It is believed that the sub-tribe numbered about 95,000 in the 1950s.

== History ==
In the 16th century, it was believed that the People of Ngokland (Ngok Lual Yak) came to the shore of River Nile from the other side of the Lower Nile. Moving out from Sudd Swam (Piou) to the East, they came to control the region of the Upper Nile River, pushing out the Funj and Jur, the Achol Eliot (Acholi?). In the 18th century, with the arrival of the Nuer, Lual Yak together with his age-group and Ngok at large was forced to evacuate some areas, like Gaak-yuom in Bor, Jokou in Gajaak, Pakoop in Ayuaal, Pabiech in Kongoor and Piny-Wuut.

They were pushed by the Nuer along the Sobat into the mouth of the Nile in Malakal. The Ngok Lual Yak became the owners of the land that runs from Malakal to Dome (Dömë), Dini and Abwong (Abɔ̈ŋ) Cheng Nyankiir along the River Sobat into the Nile at Malakal. The main borders with Nuer are Nyinrool as the border with Lou Nuer, Cuei on the side of Kurmiyom with Jikeny and Aboorbioong on the Lang-nom (Ulang) side and Nyinwak with Nuer Yom (Gajaak).

The Ngokland people lived in two groups, namely Yom and Weny. Each group was further divided into sections and again into subsections. Ngok Lual Yak people owned NgokLand. They developed a skillful traditional culture and a close spiritual bond with the land. Early settlers were experts in hunting, fishing, farming, grazing and were skillful in spear and stick fighting. NgokLand ownership was by and for the people of Ngok Lual Yak.

=== People, land and early migration ===
Ngok Lual Yak as a group is an original Jieng Group. The Jieng began with the single family of Deng with his wife Abuk. One myth tells that Deng after his mythical death turned out to be an unreasonable phenomenon, thus deriving the Jieng to worship Deng as commonly known today as Dengdit.

Another myth explains that Deng is regarded as the main source that generate water. This caused the crops to grow. Facts about the Dengdit are yet to be known but is akin to the Biblical story of Adam and Eve. Deng and Abuk are the twin marital progenitors of the Jieng Origin. Deng and Abuk are where Ngok People came from.

Ngok Lual Yak as a tribe branched out of Jieng group and staked out its own historical line. Ngok Lual Yak converged into the following groups.

== Ngok Lual Yak groups ==
=== Yom group ===
Tol Akwei

- Awier
- Baliet

Yom

- Duut
- Balak
- Dhiaak

=== Weny group ===
Paan Man Gok

- Ajuba
- Adong

Paan Man Weny

- Abiei
- Ngaar
- Achaak
- Diing

== Other Ngok groups ==
Ngok is part of the biggest chain of the other groups of Ngok like Ngok de Jook. Historically Ngok is an umbrella name for the different groups, including the NgokLand People of Ngok Lual Yak. Following are the other groups of Ngok.

The following Ngok groups are either historically related or partly blood-related groups. Out of these groups, some are commonly known as the Pan Ayuel Jeel Family.

== Earlier Ngok group, according to migration history ==
=== Ngok de Jok Group ===
- Ngok de Jok
- ngok mathiang

=== Ruweeng ===
- Paanaruu
- Aloor
- Paweny

=== Dongjol ===
- Nyiel
- Angaach
- Ageer
- Abilang
- Padang Hol
- Nyarweng

=== Marbek ===
- Hol
- Duaar
- Angaach
- Rut & Thoi

Ruweng are counted as independent Groups due to their population expansion but emerged from within Ngok.

Luach Akook De Yieu is not part of Ngok Lual Yak since the emerging of Ngok from where the came from and it doesn't fall under Marbek. The above-mentioned subsection of Padang are intending needs to be assimilated in by Ngok while they are not Ngok in reality.

== People and land ==
Ngokland is an area on the Sobat River extending from Dome to Baliet and its border Akoka to the north and northeast. More lived along the Sobat than along the Nile in Baliet. The civil wars of 1955 and 1983 affected their distribution. NgokLand includes Baliet, Dakjur (Adong), Tubuu, Gel Dhiaak, Abwong (Abɔ̈ŋ), Gel Achol and to Dome (Dömë) up to Abwong Cheng Nyankiir. The land features many broad tree lines and a pastoral grassland within the central area. Many tributaries divide the land. Most live on the western bank of the river. Traditionally, most of the western bank was the domain of influential NgokLand settlers. It is also the most olden prestigious heritage of the group.

== Populations and resettlement ==
The exact population number of Ngokland people of Ngok Lual Yak is not known, but was approximated at 80–95,000 in the 1950s.

== Jieng Domination of Upper Nile from Sudd Swamp to earlier migrations expansion to Bhar El ghazel ==
Jieng Post Migration Expansion

From Sudan Swamp to the confluence of eastern bank of River Nile and Sobat River, Jieng have been an indigenous sole landowner of upper Nile Region by earlier settlement until their migration expansion from Sudd Swamp (Piou as locally known) to Bhar El ghazel Region in 13th and 14th centuries.

The expansion of Jieng migration out from Sudd marshes into the rest of the areas within South Sudan and far beyond Sudan was noticed to be at the beginning of earlier 12th century, 13th century and 14th century. Historical domination of Jieng within Upper Nile around Sudd Swamp (Piou as known by Jieng) have been a long noticeable traced of kinship descendants from time to time.

== Sudd Swamp era, or Piou as locally known by Jieng ==
Sudd Swamp or Piou as commonly known in Jieng language was one of the locations that came under Jieng domination as their original homeland after their earlier migration up from Northern Sudan (Deeng) from Contemporary Egypt (Kook). The presence of Jieng settlement in Sudd Swamp marshland is believed to be dating back to 3000 BCE as archaeological evidence cited by archaeologist Roland Oliver shows that a transhumant cultural base of rearing cattle has been seen around Sudd Swamp for years.

Archaeologist Roland Oliver notes that the period of an Iron Age indicate presence of Jieng Nilotic around Sudd Swamp. And some of the examples of archaeological physical evidence are things like dome-shaped houses, Luaks and tukuls built by Jieng Nilotic for their livelihood around Sudd Swamp.

From 1300 to 1400, the current Jieng groups who are now mainly found in Bhar El ghazel Region began to move out from Sudd Swamp marshland into their current respective dominant locations, expanding far southwards towards common places like Shambe, Rumbek, Wau, Awiel and Kuacjok.

Yet the other Jieng dominant group currently known as Ngok Lual Yak remained in Sudd Swamp marshland until 1600. The first expansion genesis of Jieng groups who are currently found in Bhar El ghazel was one of mass exodus to look for green pasture land as well as to find a good livable dry land, because Sudd Swamp was mainly an island with no sufficient green pasture and had little dry land to sustain the population of Jieng due to the increasing number of people around Sudd Swamp marshland.

== Malakal as the headquarters of Upper Nile and Sobat District ==
The Malakal area, before it became an administrative town, was a vast pasture grass of land where cattle were driven to and kept during dry season by Ngok Lual Yak people before it was established as an administrative town.

Malakal became an initial administrative town in early 1914, when the military outpost fort that was established by Ali Pashar in 1830 was moved to Malakal on the eastern bank of River Nile. That move prompted the creation of Malakal as an administrative town and a provincial headquarter of Upper Nile Region.

Malakal also became a town council under municipality of Sobat District which was the district administrator for Ngok Lual Yak run by Percy Coriat (known as Gier-Kuach by the locals). Mr. Percy Coriat and John Lee were the first civil district administrators appointed under the leadership of Upper Nile Province Civil Governor K.C.P Truves in 1919.

== History of 9 districts of Upper Nile under Sudan Colonial Native's Administration ==
In early 1921, the British created a Native Civil Administration which empowered local authorities to participate in the governing system at the lowest grassroots level within their respective common dominated areas. So, senior inspectors could become deputy governors, and their duties would be more closely linked with strong ties to the Provincial Capitals; also, inspectors could become district officers and assistant district commissioners.

During Native Civil Administration System, Mr. K.C.P Struve became the first appointed Civil Governor in Malakal. In Nasir District, Mr. John Lee was appointed as the first civil District Administrator while in Ngok Lual Yak territory, Mr. Percy Coriat was a District Administrator for Abwong District which was made up of Ayod and Nyirol divisions and locations respectively. Abwong District later changed its name to Sobat District with its administrative headquarters in Malakal where it paid tax to River Sobat Revenue Authority with its building for Malakal town council.

In 1923, most administrative chiefs with local courts and community police were empowered and became a great system factor to reduce the level of raiding between Nuer and Jieng (Dinka) communities through administrative roles played by Native Administrations under District Administrators. In 1926, C.A. Willis succeeded Struve, and Governor C. A. Willis created an idea of an Executive Chief in 1928. He reinstated the style of Executive Chief or Paramount Chief into Native Administration.

After Sudan Independence on 1 January 1956, Upper Province was still under territories of Native British Colonial Administrations era from 1963 to 1975, with 9 Districts in Upper Nile Region. The following were the 9 Districts of Upper Nile Province as of 1 January 1956:

- Akobo District, headquarters Akobo owned by Lou Nuer
- Bentiu District, headquarters Bentiu owned by Western Nuer
- Bor District, headquarters Bor owned by Bor, Twic East and Duk
- Kodok District, headquarters Fashodo owned by Collo/Shilluk
- Nasir District, headquarters Nasir owned by Jikeny Nuer
- Fangak District, headquarters Fangak owned by Central Nuer, Rut, Thoi, Luach and Paweny
- Renk District, headquarters Renk owned by Abilang, Nyiel, Ageer, Komo and Mabaan
- Pibor District, headquarters Pibor owned by Murle/Ajabo, Jie & Kachippo
- Sobat District, headquarters Malakal owned by Ngok Lual Yak, Dongjol and Panaruu.

== Sobat District historical origin background ==
Sobat District is one of the former 9 districts of Upper Nile Region. The district was named after River Sobat because the area lies along River Sobat that runs from Ethiopia to the confluence of River Nile as its end point in South Sudan.

In 1830, Turko-Egyptian arrived in Upper Nile at the junction end of the River Nile and River Sobat. They established a military outpost fort in Wun Thony da Wiech (Dolleip Hill). The military outpost was called River Sobat Station in which the name Sobat District later came into use, but the word Sobat itself was an original name driven out from River Sobat name.

When the Tax Revenue Authority was created in Malakal town council, the same military outpost called River Sobat Station was also used as the name of the Tax Revenue Authority Buildings by the British in Malakal town. The building was called River Sobat Revenue Authority where Ngok Lual Yak paid tax to it for constructed building in Malakal town council under Sobat District Administration run by Percy Coriat.

== Government and politics ==
Earlier Upper Nile Region

In October 1897, an Anglo-Egyptian army under the command of Gen. Sir (later Lord) Horatio Herbert Kitchener was ordered to invade Sudan. Lord Kitchener initiated control of the Central Southern Sudan region up to the Nile River in Upper Nile Region.

In September 1898, Lord Kitchener, who led Anglo-Egyptians forces from Cairo toward Sudan with a mandate to conquer the land, defeated the Mahdists under the command of Khalifa Abdallahi in the battle of Omdurman. Since the British quest for land control towards Sudan was highly in plan, the army under Lord Kitchener turned their focus on the control of Southern Sudan via River Nile and River Sobat. However, French forces under Captain Marchand were already occupying Fashoda; while Belgian forces were stationed at Rejaf and Jebel Lado.

In Ngokland (Ngok Lual Yak), the British established a military outpost along River Sobat in Wun Thony da Wiech, also known as Dolleip Hill, at the confluence of River Sobat and the Nile River. While in Nasir, they occupied an old military outpost which was for Abyssinians (Ethiopians) who encroached into Sudan territory through Sobat and Baro Rivers. The military outpost was called Sobat Station, named after River Sobat, because the army was residing there.

In 1914, the military outpost that was established along River Sobat by the British was moved to Malakal. Hence, Malakal was made an Administrative Centre for Central Southern Sudan and became a Provincial Capital of Colonial Administrations.

The area remained under military rule until Mr. K.C.P. Struve was appointed as the first civilian governor of Central Southern Sudan (also known as Upper Nile Province). However, K.C.P. Struve did not rule the area independently because the military were constantly interfering with his civil administration.

== Ngok Lual Yak under Sudan Colonial Native Administrations rule ==
In early 1921, the interest in having a Native Civil Administration was preplanned by the British authorities. The concept proposed was that senior inspectors could become deputy governors, and their duties would be more closely linked with strong ties to the Provincial Capitals. It was also proposed that inspectors could become district officers and assistant district commissioners.

During Governor K.C.P. Struve's tribute system, the percentage of tax on individuals was low. When K.C.P. Struve was a governor in Malakal, Mr. John Lee was appointed as the first civil district administrator for Nasir District. Within the Ngok Lual Yak territory, Mr. Percy Coriat was a district administrator for Abwong District, which was made up of Ayod and Nyirol divisions and locations. Abwong District name was later changed to Sobat District with the administrative headquarters in Malakal.

In 1923, most administrative chiefs with local courts and community police were empowered and became a great factor in reducing the level of raiding between Nuer and Jieng (Dinka) communities through administrative roles played by Native Administrations under District Administrators. In 1926, C.A. Willis succeeded Struve, and Governor C. A. Willis created an idea of an Executive Chief in 1928. He reinstated the style of Executive Chief into Native Administration.

After Sudan Independence on 1 January 1956, Upper Province was still under territories of Native British Colonial Administration's era from 1963 to 1975, with 9 districts in Upper Nile Region. The 9 districts of Upper Nile Province have been previously listed above under section: "History of 9 districts of Upper Nile under Sudan Colonial Native's Administration".

== Malakal ==
Malakal Area, before it became an administrative town, was a vast land of pasture grass where cattle were driven to and kept during the dry season by Ngok Laul Yak people. Malakal became an initial administrative town in early 1914, when a military outpost was moved there along the eastern bank of River Nile. That move prompted the creation of Malakal as an administrative town and a provincial headquarters of Upper Nile Region.

Malakal Area also became a town council under municipality of Sobat District and was the District Administrator for Ngok Lual Yak run by Percy Coriat. Mr. Percy Coriat and John Lee were the first Civil District Administrators appointed under the leadership of Civil Governor K.C.P. Truves in 1919.

== Sobat District historical origin background ==
Sobat District is one of the former 9 districts of Upper Nile Region. The district was named after the River Sobat because the area lies along River Sobat that runs from Ethiopia to the confluence of River Nile as its end point in South Sudan. When Anglo-Egyptians arrived, they established a British military outpost in Wun Thony da Wiech (Dolleip Hill). The military outpost station was called Sobat Station in reference to the river.

== Upper Nile Region under President Jaffer Nimeri ==
In 1976, President Nimeri politically divided the Upper Nile Region into two provinces and created a new province called Jonglei out of the old Upper Nile Region of Malakal. Four former districts of Native Administration – Akobo, Bor, Fangak and Pibor – were taken into the newly created province of Jonglei. Whereas the other 5 former districts of Native Administrations – Kodok, Nasir, Bentiu, Renk and Sobat – remained in the old Upper Nile Province with Malakal as its headquarters under municipality of Sobat District which was the district administration for Ngok Lual Yak.

== President Bashir's political administration of Upper Nile Province ==
From 1983 to 1993, the Upper Nile Region remained under provincial administration – Jonglei Province, Sobat Province and Unity Province. The Jonglei Province headquarters were in Bor, Sobat Province headquarters were in Malakal, and Unity Province headquarters were in Bentiu. In 1994, President Bashir made the 3 provinces of the old Upper Nile regions into states and abandoned the Nimeri political idea of 3 provinces. When the Comprehensive Peace Agreement (CPA) was signed by John Garang and Bashir in 2005, President Bashir's idea of states was adopted by John Garang under the Protocols of CPA.

== South Sudan National Government ==
The government of South Sudan has 10 states with its headquarters in Juba. The SPLA/M ruling party is a formal rebel group. The party emerged after a civil war of 21 years. The leader is Salva Kiir Mayaardit, a Jieng. The SPLA/M held the majority in all 10 states as well as in the National Government. Under Salva Kiir, the Ngok Lual Yak have one Member of Parliament (MP) in the National Government and many ranked generals within the SPLA.

== South Sudan State Government ==
Before November 2011, Ngokland people were represented at the state level of the Upper Nile. During the 2010 election, the representation of the Ngokland people dropped, leaving them no MP at the state level in Malakal.

== Religion ==
The majority of people in Ngokland are Christians. Protestant Churches emerged in 1900. Among them is the Presbyterian Church of Sudan. Catholic and Trinity churches are present, plus non-believers who adhere to their traditional deeds.

== Language or dialect ==
The Ngok Lual Yak speak in Jieng dialect. In the 1930s, a written form of Jieng was developed following the arrival of Europeans. Characters including ŋ, NY, Y and NH were incorporated. Thoŋ de Jiëŋ later became unintelligible due to poor teaching. Earlier, Jieng was spoken on a regular basis and taught to children.
