= Ssoa =

Ssoa may refer to:

- Semantic service-oriented architecture
- South Sudan Opposition Alliance
