= National Salvation Front (South Sudan) =

Militant group in South Sudan

- The flag of the National Salvation Front
- Founder: Thomas Cirillo Swaka
- Leader: Thomas Cirillo Swaka
- Spokesperson: Suba Samuel Manese
- Dates active: 6 March 2017 – present
- Split from: -
- Split to: NAS-KB; ENAF; DRM
- Active regions: Equatoria
- Ideology: Federalism
- Size: -
- Part of: SSOMA
- Wars: the South Sudanese Civil War and the Ethnic violence in South Sudan
- Website: ww.nassouthsudan.com

The National Salvation Front (NAS) is a South Sudanese militant group led by Thomas Cirillo which has been fighting against the government of South Sudan since March 2017.

== Background ==
The group is the largest still fighting after the end of the South Sudanese Civil War. NAS mainly operates in the Equatoria region of South Sudan. Its goals are the removal of the President of South Sudan, Salva Kiir, from office and the establishment of federalism.

On March 9, 2017, Faiz Ismail Fatur, the member of the SPLA-IO high military command in Western Bahr el Ghazal, announced his resignation of the SPLM-IO army with his officers to join NAS under the leader of Gen. Thomas Cirillo.

NAS was not a party to the Revitlized Peace Agreement in South Sudan and thus continues to engage in fighting despite the ceasefire mostly holding in the rest of the country. There was, however, a minor faction of NAS that split from Cirillo's forces and signed the Agreement.

On 2 February 2019 NAS soldiers claimed to have repulsed SSPDF from Senema village near border with Democratic Republic of Congo.

== Etymology ==
While written in all caps, NAS is not an acronym, instead it is derived from the Juba Arabic word ناس (nas), meaning people.

== History ==
The National Salvation Front was founded on March 6, 2017, by Lt. Gen. Thomas Cirillo Swaka, a member of the Bari ethnic group. Cirillo had been the Deputy Chief of Staff of Logistics for the army of South Sudan, the SPLA, but he resigned on February 11, 2017, in response to what he believed was the "tribalization" of the army under the leadership of president Salva Kiir. On March 9, 2017, the SSDM-Cobra Faction under Khalid Butrous merged with NAS. On March 1, 2018, NAS joined the South Sudan Opposition Alliance (SSOA), a coalition of rebel groups that opposed the government.

On August 5, 2018, Julius Tabule Daniel declared himself the interim chairman of NAS. This led to a split in the movement, and Tabule's group declared Khalid Butrous as its leader, becoming known as NAS-KB. NAS-KB signed the R-ARCSS peace deal in September 2018, while the main NAS group under Cirillo continued to fight. Another group called the Equatoria Non-Allied Forces (ENAF) led by Moses Yanga Yoana allegedly broke away from NAS; it signed a peace deal with the government in February 2019. On October 23, 2020, Lako Jada Kwajok, a senior NAS official, resigned, citing weak leadership and the lack of a clear vision. He created the Democratic Resistance Movement (DRM) on November 30, 2020, made of former NAS members.

On September 24, 2018, NAS and members of the SSOA that did not sign the R-ARCSS formed the South Sudan National Democratic Alliance (SSNDA), led by Cirillo. Between December 2018 and March 2019, major clashes between the SSPDF (the South Sudanese army) and NAS in Yei River State displaced around 15,000 people. On August 30, 2019, the SSNDA merged with several other rebel groups to form the South Sudan Opposition Movements Alliance (SSOMA). The SSOMA entered into negotiations in Rome facilitated by the Community of Sant'Egidio, and it signed a Cessation of Hostilities agreement on January 12, 2020. While this declaration initially reduced the violence, NAS and the SSPDF resumed clashes in the summer of 2020.

== Funding and Equipment ==
NAS receives some funding by mining gold and taxing gold miners around Lobonok in Central Equatoria state, which is then sold in Uganda.

NAS's weapons and ammunition are primarily obtained through ambushing the SSPDF, and the most common weapons are AK-47s and AKM assault rifles.

== Timeline ==
=== 2018 ===
December 20: The assailants stopped two vehicles and kidnapped nine people between Kaya and Yei in the Yei River, South Sudan, with the resolution of the kidnapping unknown. No group claimed responsibility; however, sources attributed the attack to the Sudan People's Liberation Movement in Opposition (SPLM-IO), but other sources suspected that the attack was perpetrated by the South Sudan National Movement for Change (SSNMC-Unvuas). and the National Salvation Front (NAS), who denied responsibility.

December 23: Days later, assailants attacked a vehicle in Yari Mugwo district, Yei River, South Sudan. The outcome of the incident is unknown, and authorities suspect the NAS as well as the SPLM-IO.

=== 2019 ===
January 2: Militants raided a village between Gorom and Wunduruba in Jubek, South Sudan. At least 19 civilians were killed and 8 were wounded in the attack. No group claimed responsibility for the incident, however, sources attributed the attack to the National Salvation Front (NAS).

January 31: Assailants armed with machetes raided a village near Yei, Yei River, South Sudan. At least five people were killed and one person was injured in the attack. Some sources attributed the attack to the National Salvation Front (NAS), which denied involvement.

July 23: Militants opened fire on army positions in Karpeta, Namorunyang, South Sudan. There were no reported casualties in the ensuing clash, and the South Sudanese government claimed that the attack were a ceasefire violation by the NAS.

August 4-5: Armed assailants attacked South Sudan Defense Forces (SSDF) vehicles in Yei, Yei River, South Sudan, killing ten soldiers and five others were injured in the attack. No group claimed responsibility for the incident; however, sources attributed it to the National Salvation Front (NAS). At the next day, NAS militants ambushed civilians along a road in Mundri, Amadi.

August 18-21: NAS claims it repulsed an attack by SPLA troops in Loka West, killing 2 SPLA soldiers. Three days later, NAS claims it repulsed an attack by SPLA troops and pursued them to Lainya, killing 20 SPLA soldiers and capturing a large amount of ammunition. The activity of the NAS would continue to intensify its armed campaign.

=== 2020 ===
January 28 - Suspected NAS militants ambushed two civilians vehicles near Maridi, South Sudan. At least two civilians were injured and three others were abducted in the attack.

March 29-April 4: Armed assailants kidnapped 100 civilians from Mukaya, Central Equatoria. The outcome of the abduction is unknown, and the NAS is suspected of the abductions.

May 25 - Militants of the NAS opened fire on a military vehicle along Yei-Maridi Road in Central Equatoria, South Sudan. Four people, including a civilian and three soldiers, were killed and five other soldiers were injured in the attack.

August 7 - Militants attacked a gold mine at an unknown location in South Sudan, killing 9 civilians.

August 19 – NAS forces ambush a convoy of bodyguards of Vice President James Wani Igga near Lobonok, Central Equatoria State, killing six and wounding two.

August 23 - Militants ambushed a military vehicle carrying soldiers' salaries along a highway in Central Equatoria state, killing four soldiers and wounding two. Sources attributed the attack to the National Salvation Front (NAS), which denied involvement.

September 1 - Armed assailants opened fire on a humanitarian convoy in Central Equatoria, South Sudan. 2 people were killed, 4 were wounded, and several vehicles were burned during the attack. This attack forced the United Nations to deploy more troops to try to stabilize the region and reinforce surveillance of humanitarian convoys.

November 9 – Thomas Cirillo's faction of the SSOMA, which includes the National Salvation Front, recommits to the Cessation of Hostilities agreement during talks in Rome.

November 10 – NAS and the SSPDF clash in Lobonok. NAS claims that it was attacked by the SSPDF, and that NAS killed nine SSPDF soldiers and captured several guns while losing two NAS soldiers. The SSPDF claims that it was attacked by NAS, and that two NAS soldiers and four civilians were killed. This clash causes the SSOMA to pull out of the talks in Rome.
