= South Sudan Opposition Alliance =

Coalition in South Sudan

- Abbreviation: SSOA
- Leaders: Josephine Lagu; Lam Akol; Hussein Abdelbagi
- Ideology: Federalism; Anti-corruption
- Political position: Big tent
- National Legislative Assembly: 50 / 550 (9%)
- Council of States: 10 / 100 (10%)

South Sudan Opposition Alliance
- Dates active: 16 February 2018 – present
- Wars: South Sudanese Civil War

The South Sudan Opposition Alliance is a coalition of political parties and armed groups in South Sudan that opposed the government of President Salva Kiir. It was formed in February 2018 in Addis Ababa, Ethiopia, by nine groups. In September the alliance acceded to a revised peace deal with the government that also included the main rebel faction, the Sudan People's Liberation Movement-in-Opposition, but some of the member groups disagreed with the decision and split from the alliance. The pro-deal SSOA has experienced continued tension between its members, as well as with the government.

== Formation ==
The original nine groups consisted of:

- the Federal Democratic Party/South Sudan Armed Forces (FDP/SSAF), led by Gabriel Changson Chang
- the National Salvation Front (NAS), led by Thomas Cirilo Swaka
- the National Democratic Movement (NDM), led by Lam Akol
- the People's Democratic Movement (PDM), led by Hakim Dario Moi
- the South Sudan Liberation Movement/Army (SSLM/A), led by Bapiny Montuil Wegjang
- the South Sudan National Movement for Change (SSNMC), led by Bangasi Joseph Bakosoro
- the South Sudan Patriotic Movement/Army (SSPM/A), led by Costello Garang Ring
- the South Sudan United Movement/Army (SSUM/A), led by Peter Gadet Yak
- the United Democratic Republican Alliance (UDRA), led by Gatweth K. Thich

The Sudan People's Liberation Movement-Former Detainees faction (SPLM-FD), led by Pagan Amum, was also listed as a member in the SSOA's charter, but subsequent media reports suggested that it was not included in the coalition. South Sudan United Front/Army, led by Paul Malong Awan, declared its intention to join the SSOA in April, but this does not seem to have occurred.

In its foundational statement, the SSOA promised to "accelerate efforts to restore just and durable peace, democracy and to preserve human rights and the fundamental democratic rights of our people." The group condemned the "ethnic chauvinism, despotic oppression, and institutionalized corruption" plaguing the country and called for the institution of federalism. It criticized previous peace agreements for focusing too much on satisfying warring factions and not enough on long-lasting conflict resolution; it also blamed the collapse of these agreements largely on the government.

== History ==
In 2017, the Intergovernmental Authority on Development (IGAD) began sponsoring an attempt to revise and resurrect the failed 2015 peace deal. This was followed by the formation of several new political groups and militias hoping to claim a place at the negotiating table. From June to August 2018, Sudanese-sponsored talks resulted in President Salva Kiir and former Vice President Riek Machar signing several interim agreements meant to lead up to a conclusive deal. The SPLM-FD and the SSOA also participated in these talks, but were said to be marginalized.

=== First split ===
As negotiations were drawing to a close, parts of the SSOA expressed continued dissatisfaction with the terms. Cirilo, leader of the NAS, demanded the full introduction of federalism and accused Sudan and Uganda of being more concerned with preserving their material interests in South Sudan than achieving lasting peace. His supporters further alleged that Machar was only concerned with the interests of his own Nuer people.

On September 12, the Revitalized Agreement on the Resolution of Conflict in South Sudan (R-ARCSS) was signed by the government, Riek Machar's SPLM-IO, Pagan Amum's SPLM-FD, and the SSOA faction led by Changson.

SSOA groups that accepted the deal included:

- Changson's FDP/SSAF
- Akol's NDM
- Bakosoro's SSNMC
- Garang's SSPM/A
- Montuil's SSLM/A

The logo of the SSNDA, which split from the SSOA in August/September 2018.

- Gadet's SSUM/A
- a breakaway faction of the PDM led by Josephine Lagu (which later renamed to the People's Democratic Movement for Peace)
- a breakaway faction of the NAS led by Khalid Butros Bora

SSOA groups that rejected the deal included:

- Cirilo's NAS
- Dario's PDM
- Thich's UDRA
- a breakaway faction of the NDM led by Emmanuel Aban (which later renamed to the National Democratic Movement-PF)
- a breakaway faction of the SSNMC led by Vakindi L. Unvu

Four of these breakaway groups later renamed themselves the South Sudan National Democratic Alliance. Dario's PDM expressed disagreements with the others over their vision for a future government and went its own way.

==== SSNDA, SSOMA, and NSSSOG ====
The SSNDA, led by Cirilo and dominated by his NAS, was reported to be the largest rebel group outside of Machar's SPLM-IO in early 2019. On August 30, it merged with the Real Sudan People's Liberation Movement (formed by Amum after he quit the SPLM-FD) and Malong's SSUF/A to form the South Sudan Opposition Movements Alliance. This group entered into negotiations with the government, facilitated by the Community of Sant'Egidio, and signed an agreement on January 14, 2020. Despite this, fighting continued, and in October of that year SSOMA split into the SSNDA on one side and the R-SPLM and SSUF on the other during continued peace talks with the government; both groups continued to use the SSOMA name. By July 2022 they had reconciled and adopted the name Non-Signatory South Sudanese Oppositions Group, with Amum as leader. However, by May 2024 the SSNDA had split again and readopted the SSOMA name.

=== Second split, reunion, and third split ===
On November 30, 2018, the SSOA held leadership elections. Peter Gadet of the SSUM/A won. Incumbent leader Changson dismissed the elections, saying that Gadet was unfit to lead because he had been "indicted by the international community", referring to a 2014 European Union sanction against Gadet after the 2014 Bentiu massacre. Lam Akol of the NDM sided with Gadet and later accused the South Sudanese government of provoking a split to weaken the remaining opposition. Another member of the NDM accused Changson of buying support from the other party leaders with money sent from the Intergovernmental Authority on Development that was meant to be shared equally among the parties. Media reported that the dispute may revolve around who will secure the vice presidential position allotted to the SSOA in the peace deal; Changson denied these rumors.

The SSOA groups that supported Changson's leadership included:

- Changson's FDP/SSAF
- Butros's NAS
- Lagu's PDM-P
- Bakosoro's SSNMC
- Garang's SSPM/A
- Montuil's SSLM/A

The SSOA groups that supported Gadet's leadership included:

- Gadet's SSUM/A
- Akol's NDM
- a breakaway faction of the FDP/SSAF led by Thomas Peter Okac
- a breakaway faction of the NAS led by Henry Oyay
- a breakaway faction of the PDM-P led by Anas Richard Zanga
- a breakaway faction of the SSNMC led by Thomas Ali Bilal
- a breakaway faction of the SSLM/A led by Jacob Nyier Gatkuoth

Gadet died on April 15, 2019. Reportedly, many of his subordinates in the SSUM had by then defected back to the Kiir government. Also by this time, the FDP/SSAF faction led by Thomas Okac had left to join a new alliance formed by Hakim Dario's PDM.

Later that month, the spokesman for Akol's NDM (part of the faction led by Gadet until his death) joined many opposition leaders in calling for an extension of the "pre-transitional" period of the R-ARCSS, saying key parts of the agreement (such as the unification of the army and the finalizing of state boundaries) have yet to be implemented.

In July, the two SSOA factions reconciled. Each of the eight member parties would hold the position of chairman for six months, starting with Denay Jock Chagor (having assumed leadership of Gadet's SSUM/A) and followed by Changson of the FDP-SSAF. However, the other six member parties promptly rejected Chagor and appointed Josephine Lagu of the PDM-P as interim leader. Lagu's position was confirmed in an election in September, which was boycotted by Changson's FDP/SSAF and Chagor's SSUM/A.

By 2020, however, Changson and Chagor had apparently reconciled themselves with the new leadership and rejoined the SSOA.

== Current membership ==
As of April 2020, there were eight member groups within the SSOA:

- National Salvation Front (NAS), led by Khalid Butros Bora
- National Democratic Movement (NDM), led by Lam Akol
- People's Democratic Movement for Peace (PDM-P), led by Josephine Lagu
- South Sudan Liberation Movement/Army (SSLM/A), led by Bapiny Montuil Wegjang
- South Sudan National Movement for Change (SSNMC), led by Bangasi Joseph Bakosoro
- South Sudan Patriotic Movement/Army (SSPM/A), led by Costello Garang Ring
- Federal Democratic Party/South Sudan Armed Forces (FDP/SSAF), led by Gabriel Changson Chang
- South Sudan United Movement/Army (SSUM/A), led by Denay Jock Chagor
