= 2018 Juba raid =

Coordinates: 4.8500°N 31.6000°E

Juba raid
- Part of the South Sudanese Civil War
| Date | 4–5 January 2018 |
| Location | Western Juba, South Sudan |
| Result | Rebels retreat from Juba |

Belligerents
| South Sudan | SPLM-IO forces loyal to Chan Garang Lual; SPLA soldiers loyal to Paul Malong Awan |

Commanders and leaders
| Unknown | Chan Garang Lual |

Units involved
| Presidential Guard | Unknown |

Casualties and losses
| Rebel claim: 50 defected Government claim: 1 killed | Rebel claim: 1 wounded Government claim: 7 killed |

On 4 January 2018, SPLM-IO rebels loyal to Chan Garang Lual attacked the western parts of Juba, the capital of South Sudan. The raid was part of the South Sudanese Civil War. Once in Juba, the insurgents were reportedly joined by Sudan People's Liberation Army (SPLA) soldiers who were loyal to deposed chief of staff Paul Malong Awan. Following heavy fighting lasting until early 5 January, the rebels retreated into the countryside. Even though Chan Garang assumed responsibility for the attack, both the South Sudanese government and the SPLM-IO condemned the clashes, with the latter claiming that its forces had not been involved at all.

== Background ==
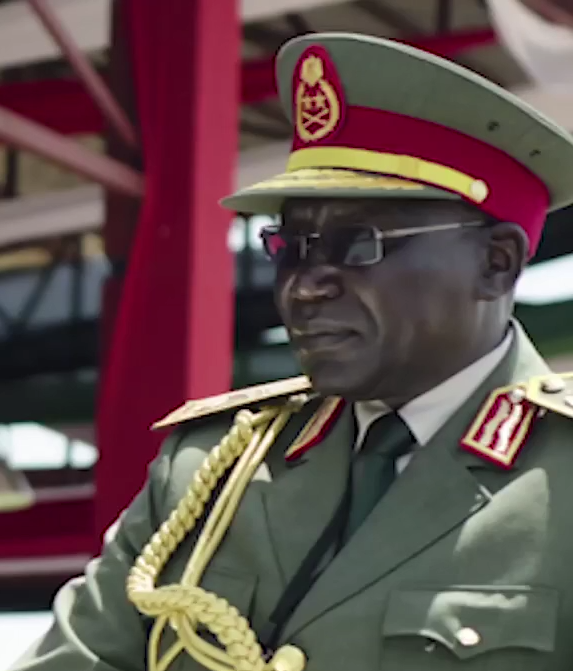
The arrest of Paul Malong Awan (depicted) drove Chan Garang Lual into rebellion

The South Sudanese Civil War erupted in 2013 as a result of disputes between President Salva Kiir and Vice President Riek Machar. The Sudan People's Liberation Army (SPLA), the country's military, consequently fractured into pro-Kiir loyalists and pro-Machar forces; the latter formed the Sudan People's Liberation Movement-in-Opposition. Attempts to end the civil war peacefully repeatedly failed.

In mid-2017, political struggles within the government resulted in Kiir deposing SPLA chief of staff Paul Malong Awan and putting him under house arrest. Several SPLA officers strongly criticized this move. A commander of the SPLA's 2nd Division, Colonel Chan Garang Lual, was one of these pro-Malong soldiers, and he opted to defect to the SPLM-IO in November 2017. He also claimed that the government and SPLA had "failed in their work". In an interview, Chan Garang stated that 150 SPLA soldiers had defected with him; he and his followers operated in Equatoria from then on.

In late May 2017, Kiir declared a unilateral ceasefire, which was taken with suspicion by others as it came after a government offensive that retook much territory and before the rainy season that would have anyway reduced fighting. Regardless, the SPLA attacked and captured Lasu, a location where a SPLM-IO headquarters was located, in December 2017. Three days later, the government signed another ceasefire with the rebels. Chan Garang later claimed that he regarded the December ceasefire as already being violated by the government due to the capture of Lasu and two clashes in Upper Nile.

== Battle ==
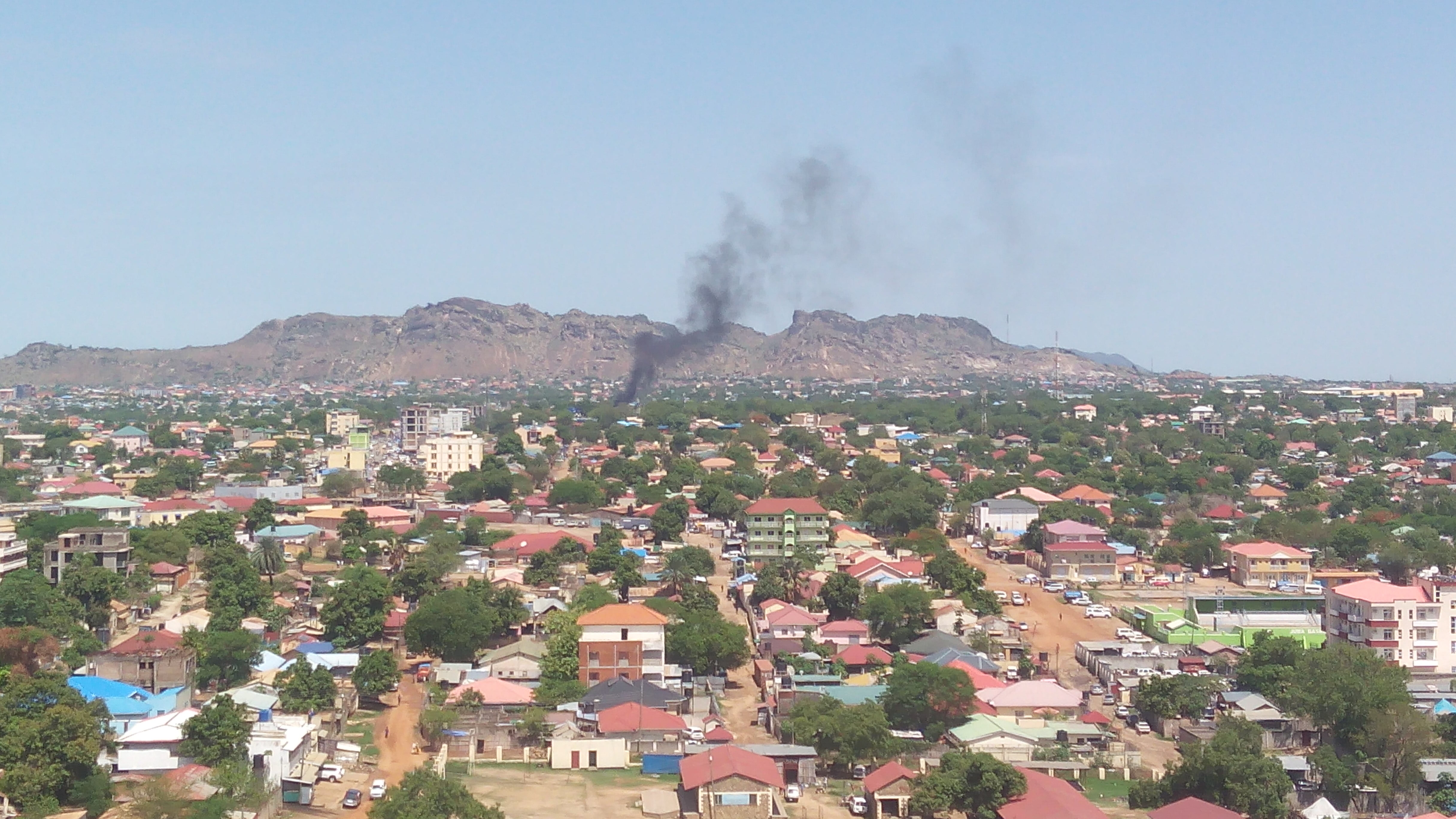
Juba in 2016

At 10 pm on 4 January 2018, SPLM-IO fighters commanded by Chan Garang Lual attacked SPLA outposts at Kupri Haboba and Lemon Gaba in western Juba. The rebels reportedly infiltrated the area by disguising themselves as civilians. Before the raid, the National Communication Authority shut down 3G internet services across South Sudan without explanation. After the start of the raid, the rebels were reportedly joined by SPLA soldiers who were loyal to Malong. Fighting between pro-government forces and the insurgents intensified between 11:20 pm and midnight, with civilians reporting gunfights and heavy artillery fire. In the end, the clashes engulfed the western outskirts of Juba, namely the neighborhoods of Gurei, Kapuri, Jebel Dinka, Gudele, Lemon Gaba, and Rock City. SPLA spokesman Lul Ruai Koang later claimed that the insurgent raid was ultimately repulsed by government loyalists at Kapuri. The Sudan Tribune stated that the rebels withdrew into the bush following the arrival of large SPLA reinforcements. The fighting caused a panic among residents.

After the fighting, Chan Garang assumed responsibility, boasting that the raid demonstrated the rebels' ability to potentially capture the capital. He stated that one of his fighters had been wounded, while two companies or 50 government soldiers had defected. The SPLA denied the defections, instead arguing that one soldier and seven rebels had been killed.

== Aftermath ==
Lul Ruai Koang claimed that the SPLA pursued Chan Garang's force after the raid, with the latter reportedly retreating toward Wunduruba. The government greatly increased security in Juba. Minister of Information Michael Makuei Lueth urged the opposition to adhere to the ceasefire in order to not derail the peace process.

The SPLM-IO officially distanced itself from the raid, claiming that the fighting had actually been caused by internal disputes within the SPLA. SPLM-IO deputy spokesman Lam Paul Gabriel argued that the fighters involved in the clashes were not formally part of the SPLM-IO, and that the government was trying to deflect attention from its own ceasefire violations of December 2017. The spokesman also falsely claimed that Chan Garang had not left his base since defecting to the insurgents.

After Malong was released from house arrest and organized the South Sudan United Front (SS-UF) rebel group, Chan Garang joined him. However, he and other Equatorian SS-UF leaders surrendered to the government in August 2018 and rejoined the SPLA.
