= Chief of Defense Forces (South Sudan) =

Highest-ranking South Sudanese military officer

Chief of Defence Forces
- Incumbent; General Santino Deng Wol since 8 May 2026
- Ministry of Defence and Veterans Affairs
- Residence: Bilpam Military Headquarters, Juba
- Appointer: President of South Sudan
- Formation: 1983
- First holder: William Nyuon Bany

The Chief of Defence Forces (CDF) is the highest-ranking military officer and professional head of the South Sudan People's Defence Forces (SSPDF) of South Sudan. The officeholder is appointed by the President of South Sudan, who serves as the Commander-in-chief of the SSPDF, and reports through the Ministry of Defence and Veterans Affairs. The position is based at the Bilpam Military Headquarters, near Juba.

== History ==
The position originated in 1983 during the Second Sudanese Civil War as the post of Chief of General Staff of the Sudan People's Liberation Army (SPLA). In May 2017, as part of a military restructuring under President Salva Kiir Mayardit, the force was temporarily renamed the South Sudan Defence Forces and the post was retitled Chief of Defence Forces accordingly.

== List of officeholders ==
=== Chiefs of General Staff (1983–2017) ===
Portrait	Name	Took office	Left office	Notes
	William Nyuon Bany	1983	1992	
	Salva Kiir Mayardit	1992	2005	
	Oyay Deng Ajak	2005	1 June 2009	
	James Hoth Mai	1 June 2009	24 April 2014	
	Paul Malong Awan	24 April 2014	9 May 2017	

=== Chiefs of Defence Forces (2017–present) ===
Portrait	Name	Took office	Left office	Notes
	James Ajongo Mawut	10 May 2017	20 April 2018	
	Gabriel Jok Riak	4 May 2018	11 May 2020	
	Johnson Juma Okot	11 May 2020	11 April 2021	
	Santino Deng Wol	11 April 2021	10 December 2024	
	Paul Nang Majok	10 December 2024	7 July 2025	
	Dau Aturjong	7 July 2025	8 October 2025	
	Paul Nang Majok	8 October 2025	8 May 2026	
	Santino Deng Wol	8 May 2026	Present	

== See also ==
- South Sudan People's Defence Forces
- Ministry of Defence and Veterans Affairs (South Sudan)
- Politics of South Sudan
