= James Ajongo Mawut =

South Sudanese army general & politician (1961-2018)

James Ajongo Mawut Unguec Ajongo

Chief of Defense Forces
- In office 10 May 2017 – 20 April 2018
- Preceded by: Paul Malong Awan
- Succeeded by: Gabriel Jok Riak

Deputy Chief of General Staff
- In office 24 April 2014 – 9 May 2017

Personal details
- Born: 1 January 1961 Sudan
- Died: 20 April 2018 (aged 57) Cairo, Egypt
- Party: Sudan People's Liberation Movement (SPLM)
- Occupation: Military Officer

Military service
- Allegiance: South Sudan
- Branch/service: Sudan People's Liberation Army
- Years of service: 1983–2018
- Rank: Lieutenant General
- Commands: Chief of Defence Force

James Ajongo Mawut (1 January 1961 – 20 April 2018) was the Chief of Defense Forces of the South Sudanese Peoples Defence Force (SSPDF). He was appointed on 9 May 2017 and took-over the office on 10 May 2017 after he was sworn in by President Salva Kiir in the presidential palace. He was an Aweilian. His native land was Barmayen, which indicates that he was from the Luo people. The current deputy governor of Aweil Uber Mawut is his biological brother.

== Military service ==
James Ajongo Mawut joined the SPLA in 1983.
