= Ministry of Peace and CPA Implementation =

Government ministry of South Sudan

South Sudan Ministry of Peace and CPA Implementation
Department overview
- Formed: 2011
- Jurisdiction: South Sudan
- Headquarters: Juba
- Minister responsible: Pagan Amum Okech, Minister of Peace and CPA Implementation

The Ministry of Peace and CPA Implementation is a ministry in South Sudan. It was formed in July 2011 following South Sudan's independence, and Pagan Amum Okech was sworn in on July 23 as the department's first minister.

The mandate of the Ministry is to promote peace, healing, reconciliation, unity and dialogue amongst institutions and the people of Southern Sudan.

== List of ministers of peace ==
Minister	In office	Party	President	Note(s)
Pagan Amum Okech	July 23, 2011–2015	Sudan People's Liberation Movement	Salva Kiir	In office
