= Josephine Joseph Lagu =

South Sudanese politician (born 1953)

Fifth Vice President of South Sudan
- In office 10 February 2025 – 26 February 2026
- President: Salva Kiir
- Preceded by: Hussein Abdelbagi
- Succeeded by: Hussein Abdelbagi

Agriculture Minister of South Sudan
- In office 13 March 2020 – 10 February 2025
- President: Salva Kiir
- Preceded by: Betty Ogwaro
- Succeeded by: Hussein Abdelbagi

Personal details
- Born: November 1953 (age 72–73)
- Party: South Sudan Opposition Alliance
- Parent: Joseph Lagu (father)

Josephine Joseph Lagu (born November 1953) is a South Sudanese politician. She is the eldest daughter of Joseph Lagu. Josephine is the Former Vice President of South Sudan in the Transitional Government of National Unity. She was appointed as one of the vice-presidents of South Sudan on 10 February 2025, On 26 February 2026 she was replaced as vice president by her immediate predecessor, Hussein Abdelbagi. Lagu previously served as Minister of Agriculture and Food Security since 2020.

== Political affiliation ==
Josephine Lagu is a daughter of Joseph Lagu. She is a member of the People's Democratic Movement founded by Hakim Darious but was elected in 2019 to the position of chairperson of the South Sudan Opposition Alliance, which comprises various opposition parties.

== Corruption allegations ==
Lagu was accused of involvement in the embezzlement of funds in 2009. However, on April 30, 2010, the High Court in Juba cleared Lagu of all the charges for lack of proof.
