= Hussein Abdelbagi =

South Sudanese politician (born 1971)

His Excellency Hussein Abdelbagi
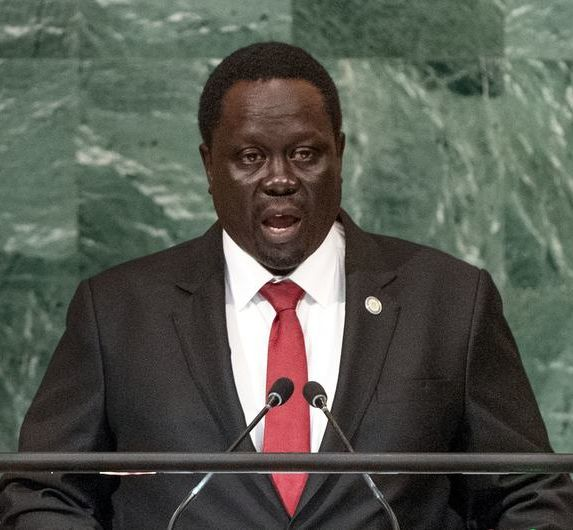
- Hussein at the United Nations General Assembly

Fifth Vice President of South Sudan
- In office 26 February 2026 – 21 September 2026
- President: Salva Kiir
- Preceded by: Josephine Joseph Lagu
- In office 23 February 2020 – 10 February 2025
- President: Salva Kiir
- Preceded by: Position established
- Succeeded by: Josephine Joseph Lagu

Agriculture and Food Security Minister
- In office 10 February 2025 – 26 February 2026
- President: Salva Kiir
- Preceded by: Josephine Joseph Lagu
- Succeeded by: Clement Juma Mbugoniwia

Personal details
- Born: Hussein Abdelbagi Akol Agony; 1971 (age 54–55) Democratic Republic of Sudan
- Party: South Sudan Opposition Alliance
- Occupation: Politician

Hussein Abdelbagi Akol Agany (Arabic: حسين عبد الباقي أكول أجاني; born 1971) is a South Sudanese politician and former vice president for service cluster in the unity government.

== Early life ==
Abdelbagi is a Malual Dinka from Northern Bahr el Ghazal. Abdelbagi, born in 1971, was a son of the politically influential Malual Dinka tribal leader Sultan Abdelbagi Akol (1928–2020), who was among other things considered the spiritual head of the Muslims in southern Sudan.

== Career ==
Abdelbagi was the chief of general staff of the South Sudan Patriotic Army, which became part of the South Sudan Opposition Alliance. On 25 August 2018, the SSPM/A split, with Abdelbagi creating a faction that claimed to have removed Costello Garang Ring for rejecting the peace process and attacking communities on the border with Sudan. On 23 July 2019, the SSPM/A faction of Costello Garang Ring claimed to remove Abdelbagi from office. He became the speaker of the South Sudan Opposition Alliance faction led by Gabriel Changson Chang after it split in November 2018.

As part of the unity government deal, the SSOA was allowed to pick one out of the five vice presidents. The SSOA failed to decide on a vice president, so they authorized President Salva Kiir to pick from a list of six leaders. On 23 February 2020, Kiir picked Abdelbagi, making him the fifth vice president. Abdelbagi was the first Muslim Vice President of South Sudan and the highest ranking Muslim to be a part of any government in South Sudan.

On 10 February 2025, President Kiir implemented a cabinet reshuffle that resulted in the replacement of Abdelbagi as vice president by Josephine Joseph Lagu and Abdelbagi becoming agriculture and food security minister. On 20 February, Abdelbagi was removed from the SSPM for insubordination and attempting to overthrow party chair Costello Garang Ring Lual. On 26 February 2026 he was reappointed as vice president once again, succeeding Lagu. His ministerial position ended.
