= Lily Albino Akol Akol =

South Sudanese politician

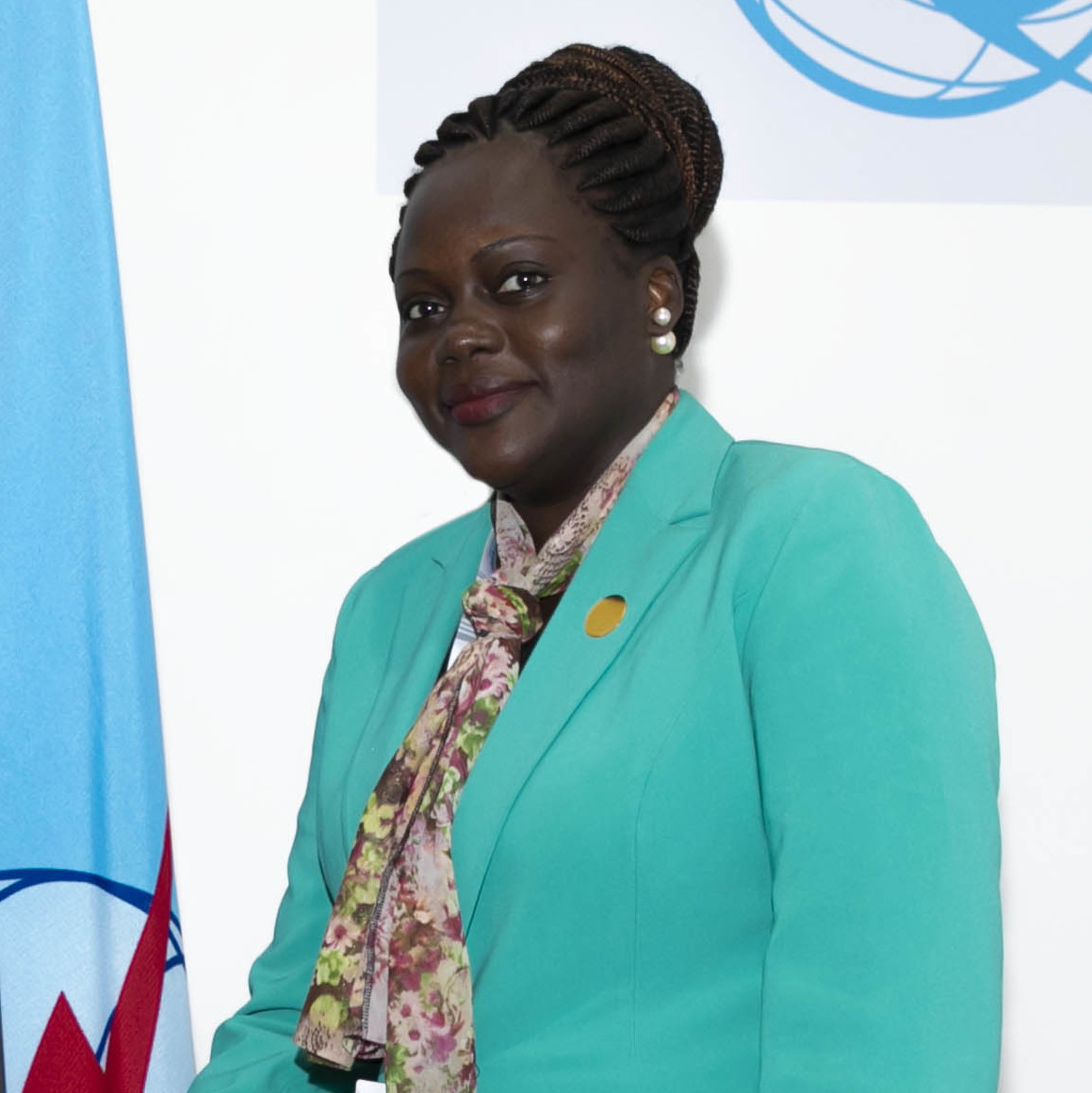
H.E. Ms. Lily Akol in 2018

Her Excellency Lily Albino Akol Akol is a South Sudanese politician who holds the constitutional post of National Deputy Minister of Information and Communication. She also serves as a Member of the South Sudan National Dialogue Steering Committee. She is the director of communication for the South Sudan Women empowerment network, and is an assistant professor at the University of Juba and serving as the director of International Cooperation, Communication and Alumni Affairs, as well as a lecturer in the College of Arts and Humanities / Department of Mass Communication.

She served as a Deputy Minister of Agriculture, Forestry and Tourism in the Government of South Sudan, 2013–2016.

== Biography ==
Hon. Lily holds a MA in corporate and organizational communication at the Farleigh Dickenson University, New Jersey and a BA in French and English Language from the University of Khartoum. she has worked as a director with South Sudan Anti-Corruption Commission; she has also worked as teaching and advocating for Sudanese refugee communities in Cairo, Egypt.
