= Denay Jock Chagor =

South Sudanese politician (born 1976)

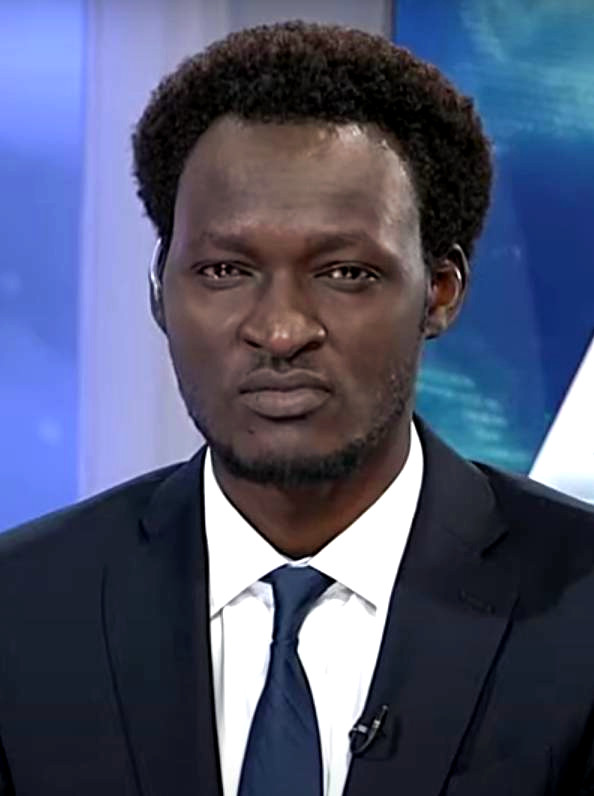
- Chagor in 2022

Governor of Jonglei State
- In office 15 July 2020 – 29 May 2024
- Succeeded by: Mahjoub Biel Turuk

Minister of Higher Education
- In office 12 March 2019 – 15 July 2020
- Succeeded by: Gabriel Changson Chang

Personal details
- Born: 1975 (age 50–51); Democratic Republic of Sudan
- Party: SSOA

Denay Jock Chagor is a South Sudanese politician who served as the governor of Jonglei State from July 2020 to May 2024.

Chagor is a Lou Nuer. In 2015, Chagor became the deputy chairman and chief of general staff for the South Sudan United Movement (SSUM), a rebel group part of the South Sudan Opposition Alliance (SSOA) coalition. Chagor also became South Sudan's Minister of Higher Education on March 12, 2019. After the death of Peter Gadet Yak, the founder of the SSUM, Chagor was appointed on May 14, 2019, as the temporary head of the movement. The SSOA was divided into two factions after a leadership dispute in late 2018, but in July 2019 Gabriel Changson Chang's Federal Democratic Party merged with the SSUM's faction and named Chagor as chairman. However, Chagor's leadership was rejected by six of the alliance's groups. On August 31, 2019, Chagor suspended three SSUM officials for disobedience; however, his term as interim chairman had expired on August 16, 2019, leading to divisions in the group's leadership. Chagor became South Sudan's Minister of Higher Education in 2019.

As part of the R-ARCSS, the SSOA was allowed to nominate one governor, the governor of Jonglei State. However, the alliance could not agree on a candidate, as the SSUM's faction nominated Chagor, while the NDM's faction nominated Mahjoub Biel. Lam Akol claimed that Chagor was ineligible to be a governor, as the minimum age for a governor is 40 and Chagor's passport said he was born in 1986, but Chagor insisted that he was born in 1975. Finally, on July 15, 2020, president Salva Kiir picked Chagor as governor, removing him from the Minister of Higher Education position. Jonglei State did not have a governor from February 22 to July 15 due to the dispute in the SSOA.

On May 29, Chagor was fired by president Salva Kiir for unspecified reasons and replaced with Mahjoub Biel Turuk, also of the SSOA.
