= Dungditand =

- village
- Location in Jharkhand, India Dungditand (India)
- Coordinates: 23.69°N 86.28°E
- Country: India
- State: Jharkhand
- District: Bokaro
- Elevation: 200 m (660 ft)

Languages
  - Official: Hindi,
- Time zone: UTC+5:30 (IST)
- PIN: 827013
- Telephone code: 06542
- Vehicle registration: JH-09

Dungditand is a village in Bokaro district in the state of Jharkhand, India. Dungditand comes under tehsil of Chas.

== Geography ==
Dungditand is located at 23.69°N 86.28°E.It has an average elevation of 200 metres (655 feet). It is situated few kilometers away from National Highway 23 and National Highway 32.

== Demographics ==
The languages spoken include Hindi, Bengali, Kudmali/Kurmali, and Khortha language.

== See also ==
- List of cities in Jharkhand
