= Thomas Cirillo =

South Sudanese politician and general

Lieutenant General Thomas Cirillo Swaka is a South Sudanese politician and the leader and Commander in Chief of the National Salvation Front (NAS), a rebel group opposing the government of the Republic of South Sudan.

== Background ==
Swaka was born to the Bari Group and is the Lieutenant General of the National Salvation Front (NAS). South Sudan's government and the rebels of the NAS announced in Rome the signing of a ceasefire agreement which to this point has yielded no positive outcome for the country since the 2015 civil war.

== Work Background ==
Thomas Cirillo is a South Sudanese politician and lieutenant general from the South Sudan People's Defence Forces (SSPDF) and was the former Deputy Chief of General Staffs for Logistics and Training and he is the founder and current opposition leader of the South Sudan's National Salvation Front.
