= Joseph Monytuil =

South Sudanese politician (born 1962)

Joseph Nguen Monytuil

Governor of Unity State
- Incumbent
- Assumed office 23 March 2026
- Preceded by: Riek Bim Top
- In office 29 June 2020 – 20 May 2024
- Preceded by: position recreated
- Succeeded by: Riek Bim Top
- In office 7 July 2013 – 2 October 2015
- Preceded by: Taban Deng Gai
- Succeeded by: position dissolved

Governor of Northern Liech State
- In office 24 December 2015 – 22 February 2020
- Preceded by: position created
- Succeeded by: position dissolved

Personal details
- Born: 1962 (age 63–64)
- Party: Sudan People's Liberation Movement (SPLM)

Joseph Nguen Monytuil (born 1962) is the governor of Unity State, South Sudan. Monytuil has served as governor of Unity State (and Northern Liech State, when it was formed from Unity State) for much of its history since South Sudanese independence, including during the South Sudanese Civil War.

== Political career ==
In 1997, Monytuil unsuccessfully ran for the governorship of Unity State, losing to Taban Deng Gai. In 2008, Monytuil was elected as the Sudan People's Liberation Movement (SPLM) chair for Unity State with the support of Riek Machar. Despite this position, Monytuil failed to secure the SPLM nomination for the governorship in the 2010 Southern Sudanese general election, which instead went to Taban Deng Gai. Monytuil declined to run as an independent; his supporters instead backed Angelina Teny, who lost the election to Taban Deng Gai.

On 7 July 2013, President Salva Kiir removed Taban Deng Gai as the governor of Unity State, appointing Monytuil to the position. Occurring during tensions preceding the South Sudanese Civil War, Taban Deng Gai was seen as affiliated with opposition leader Riek Machar, and Monytuil had the support of the South Sudan Liberation Movement/Army (SSLM/A), which remained loyal to the government after Monytuil's appointment.

In October 2015, Unity State was divided into three states as part of broader reorganization. On 24 December 2015, Monytuil was appointed as the first governor of Northern Liech State, which was formed from central Unity State. Unity State was reconstituted in 2020, and Monytuil was appointed governor of Unity State as one of the SPLM-selected governorships in the Revitalized Transitional Government of National Unity.

On 20 May 2024, President Kiir replaced Monytuil as governor of Unity State without giving an official reason. Monytuil was reappointed as governor on 23 March 2026.

== Personal life ==
Monytuil is a Bul Nuer. His brother, Bapiny Monytuil, is a principal leader of the South Sudan Liberation Movement/Army (SSLM/A).

In 2023, Monytuil was sanctioned by the United States Office of Foreign Assets Control.
