= 3rd Division (South Sudan) =

Division of the South Sudan People's Defence Forces

- Country: South Sudan
- Part of: South Sudan People's Defence Force
- Garrison/HQ: Wunyiik, Aweil East County, South Sudan
- Engagements: Second Sudanese Civil War; South Sudanese Civil War

Commanders
- Current commander: Major General Akuei Ajou Akuei

The 3rd Division (alternatively: Division 3, Lion Division, 3rd Infantry Division) is a division of the South Sudan People's Defence Force. It’s based in Wunyiik, Aweil East County, Northern Bahr El Ghazal, and it’s believed to be the strongest group among 9 other military divisions. Mathiang Anyoor based in Pantit, Aweil West, is part of Division 3.

While planning for the division's establishment was underway in 2005, the division was not actually established in the field until 2006.

Elements of the 3rd and 5th Divisions in Lakes and Western Bahr el Ghazal rebelled in March 2010, complaining about a lack of food and pay and prompting the Chief of General Staff to secure approval for emergency funding directly from the president.
