= Maiwut County =

Maiwut
- County
- Location in South Sudan
- Country: South Sudan
- Region: Greater Upper Nile
- State: Upper Nile State

Area
  - Total: 3,689 km^{2} (1,424 sq mi)

Population (2024 estimate)
  - Total: 550,000 +
  - Density: 150/km^{2} (390/sq mi)
- Time zone: UTC+2 (CAT)

Maiwut County is an administrative area of Upper Nile State in the Greater Upper Nile region of South Sudan. It borders Nasir County to its west, Longechuk County to its north and Ethiopia to its east and south.

In the South Sudanese independence referendum, Maiwut County made a historic milestone with all of its registered population voting 100% for Separation of the southern Sudan.

The payam administrator of Maiwut County is Thing Stephan Reat.

== Society ==
The people there are faced with the issues of lack of education, lack of youth job opportunities, petty crime, gang violence, bad access to roads, the rising cost of commodities, needing to heal from trauma and the lack of health facilities for women and children.

The primary mode of communication are though mobile phones.

== Climate Change ==
The Greater Region of the Sobat River has experienced unprecedented levels of flooding displacing the county's population. Extreme measures have been put in place throughout the entire South Sudan, Greater Upper Nile Region and Upper Nile State to combat extreme flooding.
