= South Sudan United Front =

Political party in South Sudan

- Leaders: Paul Malong Awan; Ajang Ajang Lino (until August 2018)
- Founded: April 2018
- Ideology: Federalism
- Part of: South Sudan Opposition Alliance

The South Sudan United Front/Army (SS-UF/A), often just called South Sudan United Front (SS-UF), is a South Sudanese rebel group which has taken part in the South Sudanese Civil War.

== History ==
=== Background ===
The South Sudanese Civil War erupted in 2013 as a result of disputes between President Salva Kiir and Vice President Riek Machar. The Sudan People's Liberation Army (SPLA), the country's military, consequently fractured into pro-Kiir loyalists and pro-Machar forces; the latter formed the Sudan People's Liberation Movement-in-Opposition. Attempts to end the civil war peacefully repeatedly failed. In mid-2017, political struggles within the government resulted in Kiir deposing SPLA chief of staff Paul Malong Awan and putting him under house arrest. Malong was characterized as a powerful Dinka nationalist. Some followers of Malong in the SPLA rebelled after his arrest.

=== Operations ===
Malong was released from his house arrest in November 2017 so that he could travel to Kenya for medical reasons. In January 2018, one of Malong's former followers, Chan Garang Lual, organized a raid into Juba. On 9 April 2018, Malong officially rebelled and announced the SS-UF would be his new organisation to challenge President Kiir. Malong accused Kiir of turning the nation into a failed state after looting the country's resources, and claimed that the SS-UF would fight for a new government system which supported federalism. The group also announced that it would become part of the South Sudan Opposition Alliance, a coalition of South Sudanese opposition factions. Several SPLA commanders and soldiers who had formerly been loyal to Malong, including those who had become part of the SPLM-IO in the meantime, joined his new force.

In August 2018, much of the SS-UF's Equatorian force surrendered to the government. About 300 fighters, led by Ajang Ajang Lino (SS-UF political leader), Chan Garang Lual (SS-UF chief of staff), and Garang Garang (SS-UF secretary general), agreed to an amnesty deal signed in Uganda. They consequently rejoined the SPLA.

The SPLM-IO and the government eventually agreed to a peace deal, but other rebel groups like the SS-UF were not included. In August 2019, the SS-UF and two other factions, namely Thomas Cirillo's South Sudan National Democratic Alliance (SSNDA) and Pagan Amum's Real Sudan People's Liberation Movement (R-SPLM) resolved to unite their activities under the "United South Sudanese Opposition Movements" (SSOMA) umbrella organization.
