= Labour Party South Sudan =

Political party in South Sudan

United Labour Party Of South Sudan (ULPOSS) حزب العمال المتحد لجنوب السودان
- Leader: Ernest Onen Aliardo Ogwaro
- Founded: 2011
- Headquarters: Juba
- Ideology: Social democracy
- Political position: Centre-left
- National Legislative Assembly: 0 / 550

Website
- https://labourpartyofsouthsudan.org/

"The Labour Party South Sudan (LPSS)" has been officially renamed to the "United Labour Party Of South Sudan (ULPOSS)" in 2023.

The United Labour Party Of South Sudan (ULPOSS); (Arabic: حزب العمال المتحد لجنوب السودان) is a political party which is based in South Sudan and is led by Ernest Onen Aliardo Ogwaro.
