= Kuel Aguer =

South Sudanese politician

Kuel Aguer Kuel
- Born: January 1, 1958 (age 68); Ariath, Aweil North County
- Citizenship: South Sudanese
- Education: University of Juba; University of Birmingham
- Occupations: Politician and academician
- Known for: Civil Rights Activism
- Title: Professor
- Successor: Akot Deng Akot
- Political party: Sudan People's Liberation Movement
- Other political affiliations: People's Coalition for Civil Action
- Criminal charges: Treason
- Criminal status: Activism
- Governor of Northern Bahr El Ghazal In office 14 August 2014 as caretaker Governor

Kuel Aguer Kuel (born 1st of January 1958) is a South Sudanese politician who was born to a cattle—keeping and farming family in Ariath Village of Aweil North County. He also served as the caretaker governor of Northern Bahr el Ghazal in 2013.

He is a founding member and the current chairperson of the People’s Coalition for Civil Action (PCCA), a pro-democracy movement in South Sudan advocating for non-violent political reform.

== Education background ==
He joined Ariath Primary School in 1970 and Aweil Intermediate in 1977. In 1980, he joined Antop Secondary School in Medani at the South of Khartoum, Gezira state in order to pursue secondary education.

Kuel then joined the University of Juba in the College of Economics and Social Studies, specialising in Public Administration and management, and graduated in 1987.

Years later, Kuel gained a postgraduate diploma in Public Administration from Birmingham University, in the United Kingdom.

== Political career ==
Kuel Aguer was a political ally of the then governor of Northern Bahr el Ghazal, Paul Malong during the 2010 election when Dau Aturjong challenged Paul Malong.

He stood firmly with Malong during the 2012 controversy over the dismissal of six state Parliament members on the allegations that they were collaborating with members of other parties against SPLM's activities. H. E Salva kiir appointed Kuel Aguer to one of delegates who are signing Nairobi people talks.

== Nairobi peace talks ==
In March 2024, Kuel Aguer was appointed as the head of the PCCA delegation to the Nairobi peace talks, which were facilitated by the government of Kenya to mediate between the South Sudanese government and opposition groups. In statements to the press, Kuel emphasized the coalition's commitment to a non-violent political solution and the need for a new democratic order in South Sudan.

== Prison ==
Kuel Aguer was detained for 17 months by National Security after being accused of treason. He was released from detention in December 2022.

The High Court found that Kuel Aguer Kuel wanted to overthrow the government since he is the senior member of the People's Coalition for Civil Action (PCCA).
