= Maiwut =

City in South Sudan

Coordinates: 8.6°N 33.9166667°E

Maiwut is a city in the Maiwut County of Upper Nile State, in the Greater Upper Nile region of South Sudan.

Located on the border between Ethiopia and South Sudan, Maiwut is near some of the historical places in Southern Sudanese struggle, like the Bilpham SPLA military headquarters, The Itang and Punyido refugees camps and the Bonga military training camps.
