= Betty Ogwaro =

South Sudanese politician

Betty Achan Ogwaro
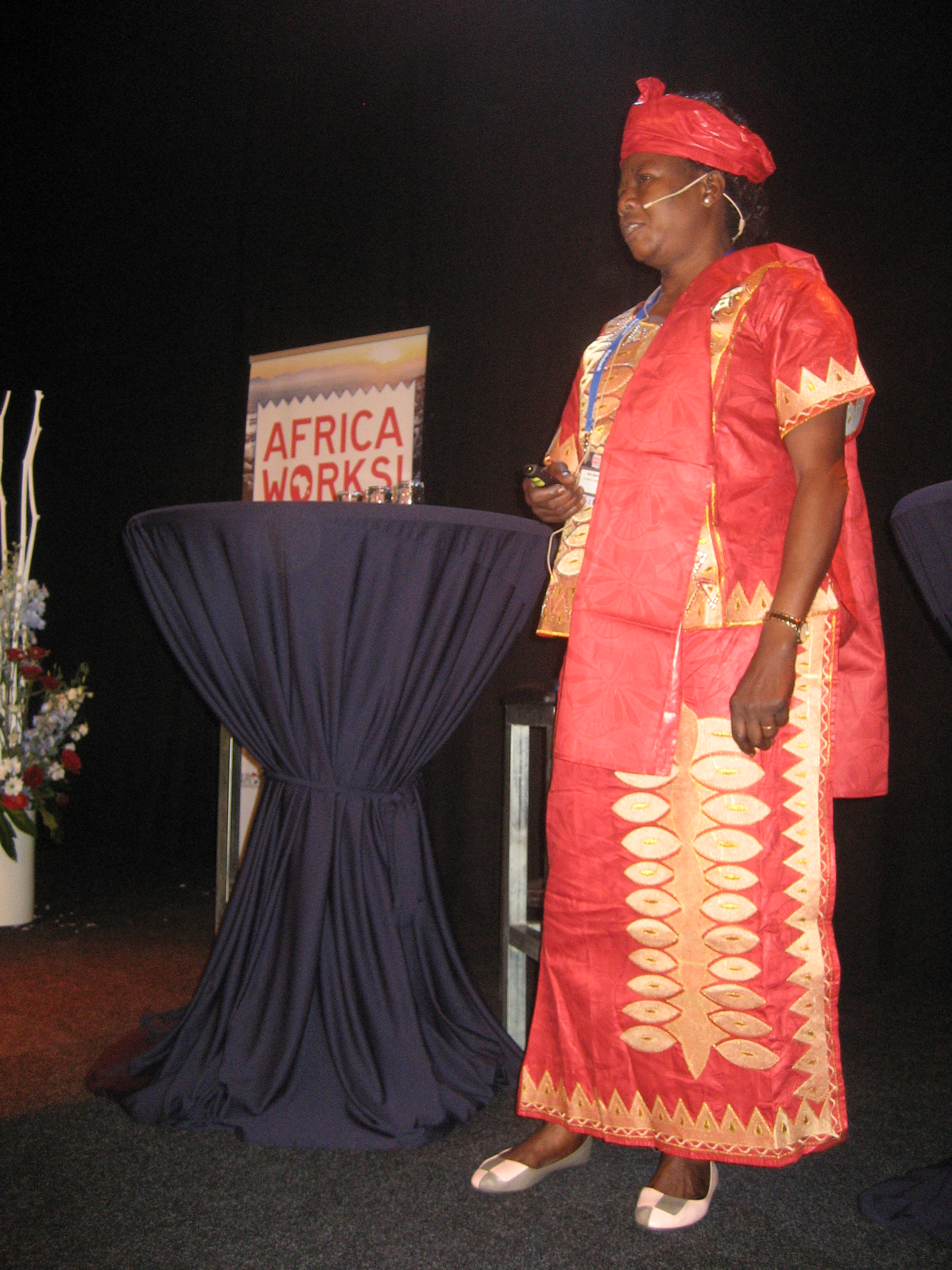
- Betty Achan Ogwaro at the Africa Works! Conference, The Hague (2014)
- Born: South Sudan
- Citizenship: South Sudanese
- Education: B.Sc. Animal Science (University of Juba); M.Sc. Veterinary Science (University of Edinburgh); Studies in Microbiology (University of Wolverhampton)
- Occupations: Politician, Activist, Veterinarian
- Known for: First Minister of Agriculture and Forestry, Republic of South Sudan; Advocate for women’s representation in governance (25% quota in CPA); Member of LRA peace mediation team; Founder of "Windows for Sudan" NGO

Betty Achan Ogwaro is a South Sudanese politician in the government of South Sudan. Ogwaro was the former and the first minister of Agriculture and Forestry in the Republic of South Sudan.

== Education ==
Ogwaro holds a bachelor's degree in animal science with honors from the University of Juba. She also earned a master's degree in veterinary science from the University of Edinburgh. She has also worked towards degree in a microbiology at the University of Wolverhampton, in the United Kingdom.

== Career ==
Betty Ogwaro served as Director of Animal Production for the Government of Southern Sudan until 1995 when she went into exile in the United Kingdom. She was the chairperson for the Sudanese People Liberation Movement (SPLM) chapter office in the Midlands from 1999 to 2005, and is one of the women leaders who successfully negotiated the inclusion of 25% minimum women representation at all levels of governance as part of the Comprehensive Peace Agreement. Ogwaro is a founder of "Windows for Sudan", an NGO which seeks to promote the participation of Sudanese women in development and elevate their status in society. She has also consulted for UNIFEM on women's issues.

is a member of the mediation team negotiating peace settlement between the Lord's Resistance Army (LRA) and the government of Uganda, and the first Sudanese woman to challenge Joseph Kony, the LRA's top leader, face-to-face for the group's atrocities in the Sudan and their lack of commitment to the peace process. In 2007, Ogwaro served as president of the Southern Sudanese Women's Parliamentarian League, which advances the participation of Sudanese women leaders in politics and decision making. She was also the chair of the Southern Sudanese Women Caucus, where influential women's organizations work to respond to the needs of Sudanese communities. She was a member of several committees, including specialized committee for Gender, Social Welfare, Youth and Sports. She combines her parliamentarian work with promoting women in agriculture.

In 2007 Salva Kiir appointed her State Minister for Agriculture, Animal Resources, Forestry, Cooperative and Rural Development in Eastern Equatoria State. progressing to become the Government of The Republic of South Sudan National Minister for Agriculture and Forestry in 2011.
