= Longechuk County =

Longechuk Yomdoang
- County
- Country: South Sudan
- Region: Greater Upper Nile
- State: Upper Nile State

Government

Area
  - Total: 6,916 km^{2} (2,670 sq mi)

Population (2017 estimate)
  - Total: 91,442 +
  - Density: 13.22/km^{2} (34.24/sq mi)
- Time zone: UTC+2 (CAT)

Longechuk County is an administrative area in the Upper Nile State, in the Greater Upper Nile region of South Sudan.

Longechuk County is the second largest county in term of landmass next to Akoka County in Upper Nile State . It has a population of 114,603 according to the household count in 2011. The county is inhabited by Nuer Section of Gaat, Jaak (Jikany) and Koma tribe. However, the County bordered Maiwut County in the East, Ethiopia in the Mideast, Nasir County in the South East, Akoka County in the Midwest, Melut County in the West, Mabaan County in the North West and Blue Nile and Assossa in the North East. It has the following administrative Payams: Udier, Dajo, Pacime, Jaak, Chotbora, Pamac, Jongjith, Wetber, Malual, Gueng, Warweng, Jangok, Guelguk, Belwang and Mathiang Administrative center respectively.

Longechuk County has 6 Primary Health Care Units (PHCU), and 26 primary schools, as well as 2 middle schools and 1 secondary school located in the county administrative center. Locally, it has 1 paramount Chief and 9 head chiefs.

It is one of the oil producing county next to Melut county. It also has the largest quantity of oil reserve in Upper Nile State. In 2006 a lone, over 270 oil wells are currently in production, and well over 370 oil wells are pending for production due to the proclamation for independence of South Sudan in 2011.

In addition, it has the largest and the longest swamp in South Sudan which extended from Kor-Machar mouth (Bank of Sobat river) to Kor Adar in Meluth county. All different animal species are found roaming in its wilderness. It has the largest animal migration in Upper Nile State. The animal migration usually occurs specially in the months of November throughout February.

Longecchuk County has huge mineral deposit in areas such as Pamac, Dajoh, Mayethe and Pacime respectively.

Politically, Longechuk County was governed by the following commissioners according to the order of the time and sequence :

1. Hon. Stephen Pal Kuon - 2006 - 2009
2. Hon. Gach Puok Dak - 2009 -2010
3. Hon. Stephen Kueth Gach - 2010 - 2013
4. Hon. Michael Ruot Gatkuoth - 2013 - 2013
5. Hon. Dak Tut Dey August 2014-June 2017 (IO Commissioner)
6. Hon. Thing Ruach- June 2017- April 2018 (IO Commissioner)
7. Hon. Mading Gang Bol- April 2018 - 2020 (IO Commissioner)
8. Hon. Dak Tut Dey November 2020 – 2025 ( IO commissioner)
9. Hon. Tulith Koang Diew 2025–present (IG Commissioner)
