= South Sudan Patriotic Army =

South Sudanese rebel militia

- Leader: Brig. Gen. Agany Abdel Bagi Ayii Akol
- Spokesperson: Brig. Gen. Deng Mareng Deng (until Oct. 2017)
- Dates active: 2016/17 – present
- Allegiance: Costello Garang Ring's South Sudan Patriotic Movement; Paul Malong Awan (possibly)
- Group: Dot Baai brigade
- Active regions: Bahr el Ghazal region of South Sudan
- Ideology: Anti-Salva Kiir
- Size: 15,000 (self-claim)
- Wars: the South Sudanese Civil War

The South Sudan Patriotic Army (abbreviated SSPA) is a South Sudanese rebel militia that takes part in the South Sudanese Civil War and serves as the military wing of Costello Garang Ring's South Sudan Patriotic Movement. Well armed and relatively numerous, the SSPA mostly operates in Northern Bahr el Ghazal and is considered to be one of the most powerful rebel groups in South Sudan.

== History ==
=== Origins ===
The SSPA was founded by Brig. Gen. Agany Abdel Bagi Ayii Akol in Northern Bahr el Ghazal sometime between early 2016 and April 2017. From its first appearance, the SSPA possessed equipment that was unusually sophisticated for a new rebel group, including uniforms, technicals, PK machine guns, RPGs, and Kalashnikov rifles. Observers noted that this might hint at a powerful patron supporting the group.

Accordingly, there has been much speculation about possible links between the SSPA and various South Sudanese strongmen. One news website argued that the militia could be a front organization of Paul Malong Awan, the former SPLA Chief of General Staff, as the SSPA's emergence coincided with the arrival of Malong's private army Mathiang Anyoor in Aweil State. Furthermore, numerous suspected followers of Malong are known to have joined the SSPA. On the other side, the militia shares its name with the South Sudan Patriotic Movement (SSPM) of opposition politician Costello Garang Ring. Though it was initially denied that Garang had any connections with the SSPA, the militia's spokesman Deng Mareng Deng eventually revealed Garang as the SSPA's political leader.

=== Operations ===
The SSPA's initial base reportedly was Meram in Aweil East State, from where it started to attack positions of the SPLA in the nearby Rumaker in late April 2017. In June, the militia claimed to have captured the towns of Malek Gumel and Warguet, and announced its plans to conquer Paul Malong Awan's hometown of Malualkon, near Aweil. The government officially denied the fall of either town to the rebels, while a local policeman confirmed that Malek Gumel had been conquered by the SSPA, though Warguet remained under SPLA control. The SSPA also claimed to have captured large amounts of weaponry and other equipment in course of the fighting at the two towns. By August 2017, the SSPA had lost Malek Gumel, however, and launched another attack on it as well as Majak Wei. These assaults were repulsed by the government military.

In September, the SSPA claimed to have initiated talks with other rebel factions to coordinate their military actions. Agany Abdel Bagi Ayii Akol stated that the insurgents would form an alliance which would include the SSPA, alongside forces loyal to Riek Machar, Lam Akol, Thomas Cirillo, Joseph Bangasi Bakosoro, and John Uliny. The latter however denied that any talks were taking place with the SSPA.

By October 2017, the SSPA was considered to be one of the greatest threats to the South Sudanese government, having made "significant military gains" at this point. Despite this, the militia's spokesman Brig. Gen. Deng Mareng Deng defected to the government in late October, citing his disappointment in Costello Garang Ring's political direction as reason. In January and February 2018, however, several followers of Malong joined the SSPA alongside their personal militias. Among these were Kuol Athuai Hal, Manut Yel Lual, and Baak Bol Baak.

On 25 August 2018, Brig. Gen. Agany declared himself "interim leader" of the entire South Sudan Patriotic Movement, effectively ousting Costello Garang Ring as the party's head. He claimed that he had been elected by the SSPM/A's other leading figures after Costello had failed to uphold his commitment to the ongoing Khartoum peace talks between the government and various rebel factions. The general said that he had consequently entered the peace talks, and could "reassure the public that there is no any problem at all". Costello responded by stating that he fully supported the peace process, and Agany had "no authority" to replace him anyway. The dispute continued until 4 September, when another SSPA commander announced that Agany and Costello had reconciled, with the latter having agreed to "resolve some administrative issues". It was later clarified that the disagreements between the two would be settled by a mediation committee formed by SSPM and tribal leaders.

== Organization ==
The SSPA's founder and military leader is Brig. Gen. Agany Abdel Bagi Ayii Akol, an ethnic Dinka and son of tribal leader Abdel Bagi Ayii Akol. Agany served as officer in the SPLA before joining Peter Gadet's rebellion against the South Sudanese government in 2016. Brig. Gen. Deng Mareng Deng served as the group's spokesman until his defection in October 2017. General Hussein Abdel-Bagi Akol is another senior commander.

The militia claims to have 15,000 fighters under its command and is split into a number of sub-units, one of them being the Dot Baai (Save the Homeland) brigade. Its forces mostly consist of Dinka, but have reportedly managed to attract fighters from other ethnic groups as well.
