= Pagan Amum =

South Sudanese politician (born 1959)

Pa'gan Amum Okiech
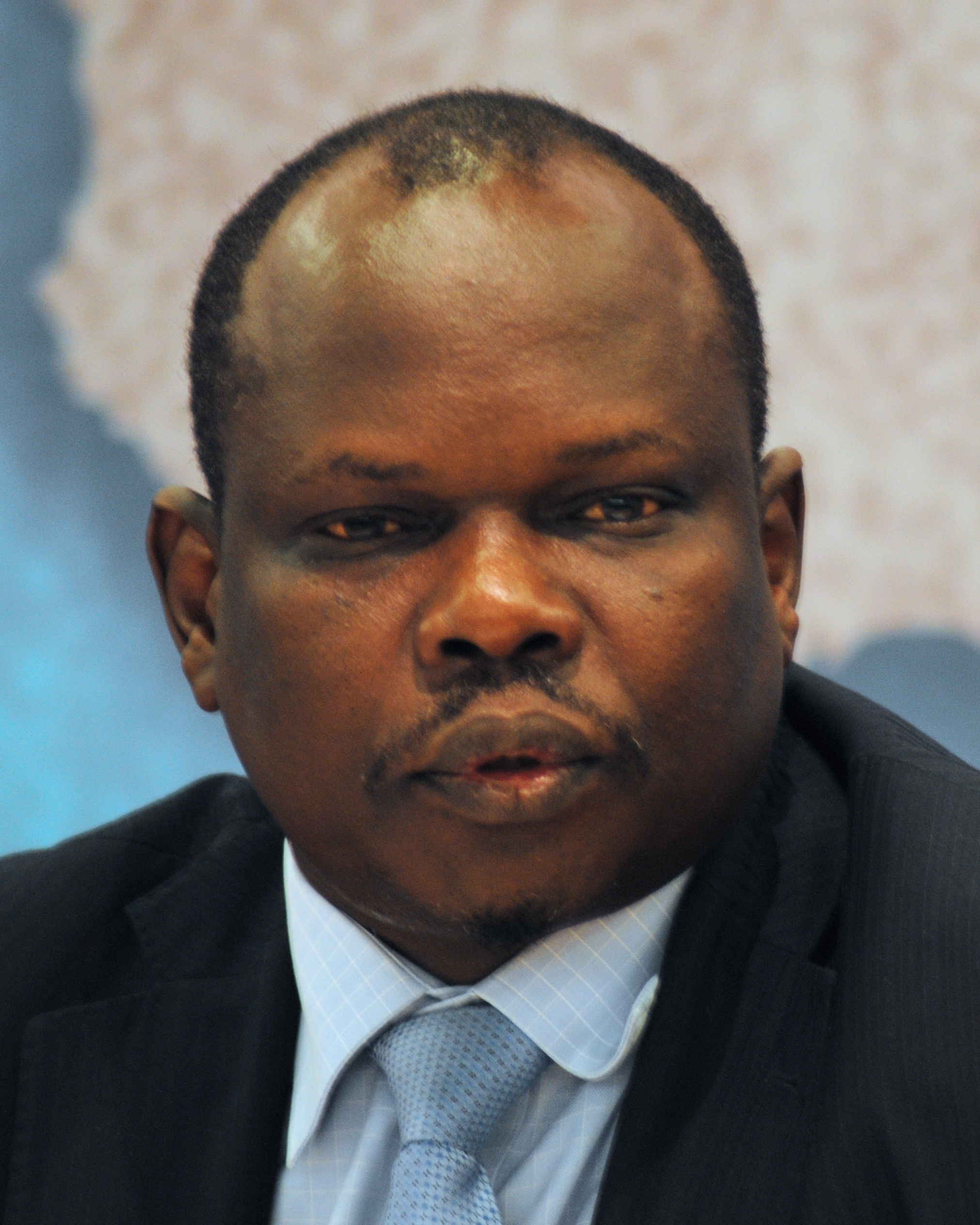
- Pa'gan Amum in 2012

Ministry of Peace
- In office 23 July 2011 – 2015
- President: Salva Kiir
- Preceded by: Position established

Personal details
- Born: 3 January 1959 (age 67) Wat, South Sudan (then Sudan)
- Party: Sudan People's Liberation Movement

Pa'gan Amum Okiech (born 3 January 1959) is a South Sudanese politician. He is the co-founder of South Sudan Reborn, a political organisation that attempts to bring peace to South Sudan and is the primary spokesperson. He is also the head of the SPLM-Former Detainees (SPLM-FD).

== Early life ==
Pa'gan Amum Okiech was born in a small post known as Wat in the Lou Nuer area. His father was a non-commissioned police officer responsible for the Wat post. His family moved to Malakal after his grandfather, Okiech, chief of the Ubuar people, died and Pa'gan Amum's father was asked to take over the role. His father went from being a clan chief to later being paramount chief and president of the court.

His mother named him Pagan, which means 'incredible' in the Shilluk language. Both his parents were educated and his family had considerable wealth. His father acquired substantial tracts of land, farmed various crops and operated a series of shops in Malakal. He left home to study at the University of Khartoum in the late 1970s, where Southern Sudanese students were a minority.

== Sudanese civil wars ==
In 1982, Pa'gan Amum left law school in Khartoum to organize and command a group of young revolutionaries committed to the establishment of a new country in southern Sudan. This group joined with other insurgent groups to form the Sudan People's Liberation Movement (SPLM) under the leadership of Pa'gan Amum's mentor Dr John Garang de Maboir.

In 2005, Pa'gan Amum was part of Dr. Garang's team that negotiated the comprehensive peace agreement (CPA), which brought to an end the Sudanese Civil War and led to a historic, internationally supervised referendum in 2011.

== South Sudanese politics ==
After the referendum, Pa'gan Amum continued his service as Secretary General of the SPLM. He was elected by the National Liberation Council.

He was also South Sudan's Chief Negotiator with Sudan on post independence issues. He served as the Minister for Peace and Comprehensive Peace Agreement (CPA) Implementation in the Government of Southern Sudan, prior to independence in 2011, and as the caretaker Minister of Peace in the first government post-independence, taking office on 23 July 2011.

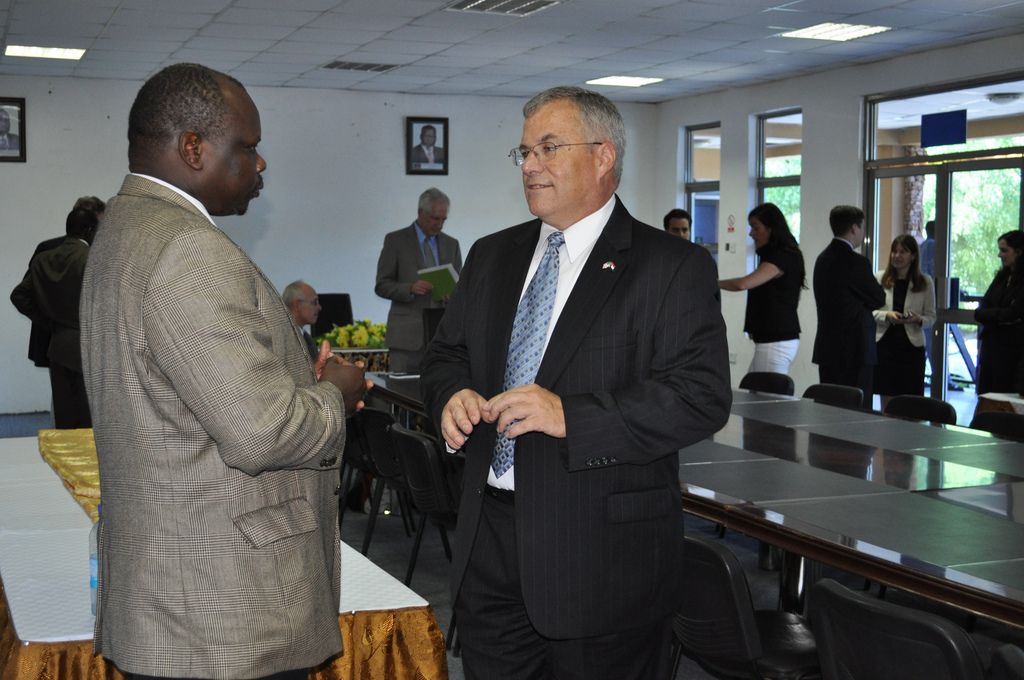
Amum (left) with special envoy Scott Gration (right)

In 2011, he was the chief negotiator, negotiating on behalf of the South Sudanese government with the Sudanese government over splitting oil revenues after South Sudanese independence. In January 2012, Sudan confiscated the South's oil shipments at Port Sudan, effectively holding hundreds of millions of dollars of revenue hostage in order to secure a stronger bargaining position during revenue negotiations. In retaliation, the South Sudanese government threatened to shut down all oil production. A few days later, the South Sudanese council of ministers chose to completely shut down all oil production.

President Salva Kiir (of South Sudan) and President Omar al-Bashir (of Sudan) negotiated an agreement to the stand-off during an emergency heads of state summit at Addis Abba, however Pa'gan Amum rejected the agreement and refused to sign it. President Kiir was then forced to renege on the agreement, infuriating the Sudanese. In 2013, the South Sudan descended into civil war and on 23 July that year, Pa'gan Amum was put under house arrest by SPLM and suspended from all official duties. A trial against Pa'gan Amum and three other SPLM leaders (the 'detainees') accused of treason began the following year in March, 2014 but was overturned in April.

During this period, Pa'gan Amum claims he avoided several assassination attempts.

In June 2015, the detainees were returned to Juba from exile in Kenya and were reintegrated into the ruling party. Pa'gan Amum was re-instated as secretary general.

Pa'gan Amum signed the 2015 peace agreement in Addis Ababa between the current government and the opposition.

Claiming continuous threats to his security, Pa'gan Amum is currently in exile in the United States.

He is currently living in Denver, Colorado. In 2017, he received a restraining order against Amira Ali and then sued her for slander after she posted videos on Facebook accusing him of murder and rape.

== See also ==
- Ministry of Peace (South Sudan)

Political offices
Preceded by Position established	Minister of Peace; 2011 - 2015	Succeeded by No Incumbent
