= Paul Malong Awan =

South Sudanese politician and military figure

Paul Malong Awan Anei
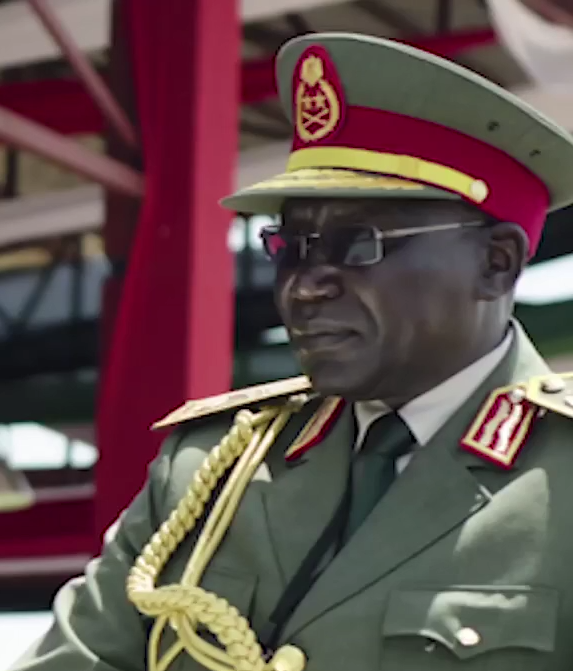
- Paul Malong in uniform

SPLA Chief of General Staff South Sudan
- In office 24 April 2014 – 9 May 2017
- Preceded by: James Hoth Mai
- Succeeded by: James Ajonga Mawut

Governor of Northern Bahr el Ghazal
- In office 27 March 2008 – 23 April 2014
- Preceded by: Colonel Madut Biar Yel
- Succeeded by: Kuel Aguer Kuel (as caretaker)

Personal details
- Born: Early 1962 Warawar village, near Aweil, Bahr el Ghazal, Sudan
- Party: Sudan People's Liberation Movement (SPLM)
- Occupation: Military officer, politician, and entrepreneur
- Website: www.malongfoundation.org
- Nickname: King Paul

Military service
- Allegiance: South Sudan
- Branch/service: Sudan People's Liberation Army
- Years of service: 1983–present
- Rank: Lieutenant general
- Commands: Governor of Northern Bahr el Ghazal; Chief of general staff

Paul Malong Awan (born 1962), also known as Paul Malong Awan Anei, King Paul, and General Paul, is a South Sudanese politician and military figure. Until 16 May 2017 he was the Chief of General Staffs (COGS) of the Sudan People’s Liberation Army (SPLA). The Chief of General Staffs was the highest-ranking military officer in the SPLA (now South Sudan People’s Defense Forces), and also the principal military adviser to the President of the Republic of South Sudan and the National Security Council.

He formerly served as governor of Northern Bahr el Ghazal from 27 March 2008 to 2014.

== Early life and education ==
Malong was born in early 1962 in the village of Warawar, which is in the former Northern Bahr el Gazal state and situated about forty-five kilometers north of Aweil. His mother was Aluat. His father, Awan Anei, was a chief who governed his kinsmen in the Wun-Anei section of Abiem, situated in the current Aweil East state. At eight years old, Malong's father was killed by a member of his community. Malong's older siblings are deceased. In the order of their birth (excluding the deceased), the children of Aluat and Anei are Agot, Amou, Malong, and Atak.

As a child, Malong attended schools in his village. After his father was killed in late 1965, Malong moved to Muglad, Sudan, where he completed primary school in 1969. He completed his intermediate education at St. James in Khartoum, where he participated in the clandestine formation of the Anyanya II movement in the Bahr el Gazal area.

Malong has more than 100 wives.

== Career ==
Malong arrived in Ethiopia in July 1984 to join Sudan People's Liberation Movement. He was then transferred to the Steel (Hadit) Battalion of the Koryom Division. He went to Officers' Cadet and graduated with the rank of captain in July of the same year. After his graduation, he was transferred to Northern Upper Nile State around the Maban area. He then returned to Itang, which was then the second largest refugee camp in Ethiopia. After a few months of lull, he was recalled and commissioned to the rank of major in October 1985. He was then posted to southern Blue Nile in the Eagle Battalion, where he spent three years at the battle front.

In April 2014 Malong was appointed chief of general staff of the Sudan People's Liberation Army by the president of South Sudan, Salva Kiir. He replaced James Hoth Mai.

After he collapsed in Juba in December 2016, he was taken to Nairobi, Kenya, for treatment at Nairobi Hospital.

In May 2017, President Kiir issued a presidential decree that replaced Malong with General James Ajonga Mawut. Malong left Juba with his officials. There was speculation that Malong and his officials would spark a rebellion and he was asked to return to Juba before reaching his destination. Malong denied the accusation on Eye Radio, "I want to live as a normal person, as you know that this month of May is all concerning cultivation; my tractors are already in the fields that is why you have seen me heading to Aweil." Malong also spoke to Radio Miraya FM, a United Nations radio station, "Whatever has been said, there is no reality, because if I wanted to have a problem, that problem should be in Juba."

In August 2017, an appeal by Lucy Ayak, one of General Malong's wives, was published revealing for the first time that General Malong was under house arrest and that he needed medical attention. The government initially denied General Malong's house arrest, but later admitted that he was indeed under confinement. After several appeals, he was released on medical grounds and was allowed to travel to Nairobi for medical treatment. Following his arrival in Nairobi, allegations of General Malong mobilizing against the Kiir government started circulating but were quickly denied as propaganda by his opponents. However, on 9 April 2018, General Malong officially announced the formation of a rebel outfit, the South Sudan United Front/Army to topple the Kiir government.

== Alleged war crimes ==
During the Anti-Nuer pogroms in 2013, many of the killings were carried out by a group known as Dot Ke Beny (rescue the president) or Mathiang Anoor (brown caterpillar), a militia of Dinkas formed for the protection of President Kiir and Paul Malong Awan. The US pushed for an arms embargo and sanctions on Machar and army chief Paul Malong Awan through the Security Council, but it failed to receive enough votes to pass the sanctions in December 2016.
