= Akobo =

Akobo may refer to:

- Akobo (woreda), Ethiopia
- Akobo River, on the border between South Sudan and Ethiopia
- Akobo, South Sudan
- Akobo County, South Sudan
- Akobo State, South Sudan
- Akobo Airport, located in Akobo, South Sudan
