= John Garang Memorial University =

Education organization in Juba, South Sudan

John Garang University.
- Motto: Knowledge is Strength
- Type: Public
- Established: February 2007; 19 years ago
- Chancellor: Salva Kiir
- Vice-Chancellor: Prof. Abraham Matoc Dhal PhD
- Administrative staff: 120
- Students: 1,000
- Location: Bor, South Sudan; 06°13′12″N 31°33′00″E
- Campus: Urban
- Website: Homepage

Dr. John Garang Memorial University Of Science and Technology (DrJGMUST) is a public university in the Republic of South Sudan. The school is named after the Sudanese Politician John Garang.

== Location ==
The university's main campus is located in the town of Bor, Jonglei State, on the banks of the White Nile River. This location lies approximately 185 kilometres (115 mi), by road, north of Juba, the capital and largest city in that country. The approximate coordinates of the main university campus are: 6° 13' 12.00"N, 31° 33' 0.00"E (Latitude: 6.220000; Longitude: 31.550000). The coordinates are approximate because the university campus does not yet show on most publicly available maps.

== Overview ==
John Garang University is one of the five (5) public universities in South Sudan. The list includes the following institutions:

1. University of Juba, in Juba
2. University of Bahr El-Ghazal in Wau
3. Upper Nile University in Malakal and
4. Rumbek University in Rumbek

== History ==
The university was founded in February 2007, as the John Garang Institute of Science and Technology. The institute was elevated to university status in 2010.

== Academics ==
As of January 2014, the university maintained five Colleges and one Institute, with plans for new ones to open in the future. The following Colleges are currently in operation:

- College of Agriculture
- College of Education
- College of Environmental Sciences
- College of Management Sciences
- College of Sciences and Technology
- Padak Institute of Fisheries

== See also ==
- Bor, South Sudan
- Education in South Sudan
- Greater Upper Nile
- Jonglei State
- List of universities in South Sudan
