= Akobo Heritage and Memorial University =

Coordinates: 7.77699°N 32.98593°E

- Established: 2016
- Location: Akobo, South Sudan

Akobo Heritage and Memorial University (AHMU) is a university in South Sudan.

== Location ==
The university is located in the town of Akobo, in Akobo County, Jonglei State, in the Greater Upper Nile region of South Sudan, close to the International border with Ethiopia. This location lies approximately 450 kilometres (280 mi), by road, northeast of Juba, the capital and largest city in the country.

== See also ==
- Akobo
- Akobo Airport
- Akobo County
- Jonglei State
- Greater Upper Nile
- Education in South Sudan
- List of universities in South Sudan
