= Women in South Sudan =

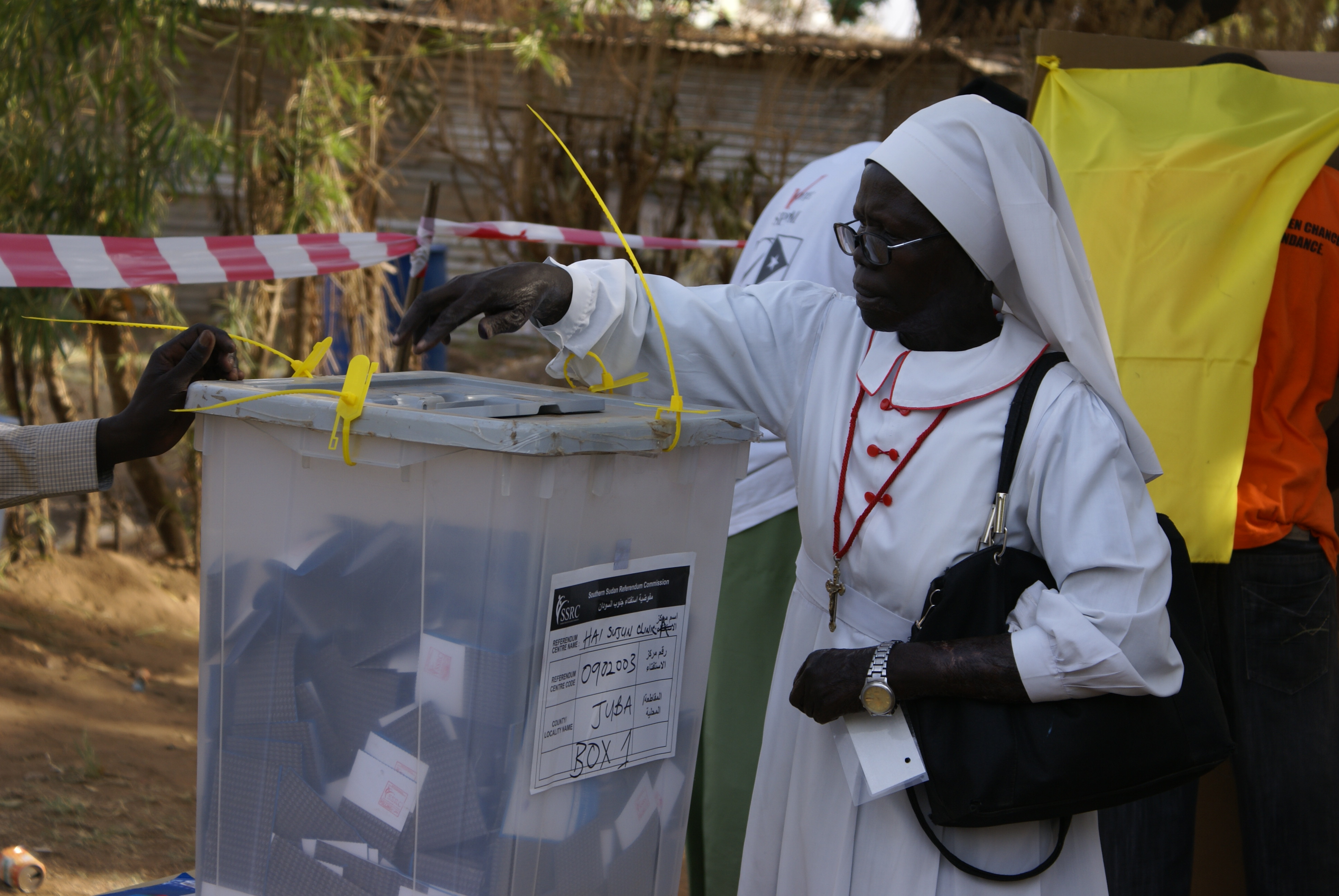
A nun from South Sudan voting during the January 9, 2011 elections.

Women in South Sudan are women who live in and are from South Sudan. Since the Independence of South Sudan on 9 July 2011, these women have gained more power but still face issues of inequality. Many women in this area do not have adequate access to health resources and education. While these women often face inequality, there has been progress since South Sudan's official declaration of independence. In recent years, this inequality has gained national attention and people have become more interested in the issue of child marriage that this area faces. Along with this, there has started to be a focus on the very high level of maternal mortality in South Sudan. With a maternal mortality rate of 789 deaths per 100,000 live births, South Sudan has one of the highest rates in the world.

== Demographics ==
Currently the total population in South Sudan is 12,919,053. In recent years, the population of males has surpassed the population of females. In 2018, the population for females was 6,444,329 and the population for males was 6,474,720. Women in South Sudan make up around 42 percent of the country's total population. They are a smaller population when compared to the male population.

Total Population by sex
Year	Female	Male
2000	3,337,668	3,362,998
2005	4,045,798	4,063,072
2010	5,032,251	5,034,945
2015	5,950,069	5,932,058
2020	6,824,253	6,785,749

== Impact on conflict ==
Since gaining independence in 2011, South Sudan has faced ongoing conflict that has severely impacted women. The war has deepened gender inequalities and created new challenges for women, with many facing increased violence, displacement, and poverty.

Violence against women, particularly sexual violence, has become increasingly common and accepted result of the war. Apart from armed organizations, women and girls are vulnerable in their own homes and communities because structures supposed to safeguard them are either lacking or inadequate. Families living in extreme poverty often employ forced marriage, rape, and sexual exploitation as weapons of war or as survival tactics, and many survivors are left without protection, mental health care, or legal action. Studies reveal that poor institutional reactions, fear of retribution society shame continue to underreport events of sexual violence. Additionally, sexual assault has been deliberately utilized strategically throughout conflict.

Formal and customary legal systems of South Sudan sometimes fail to hold offenders responsible since many women are discouraged from reporting abuse because of stigma, fear of reprisals, or mistrust of authorities.

Many of the women affected by the conflict are displaced, aggravating their poverty. In Rumbek, women's income-generating initiatives have been hindered by instability, cultural limitations, and lack of support, increasing their vulnerability to economic exploitation. A report from the United States Institute of Peace states that displacement has pushed women into informal labor sectors, diminished the effectiveness of programs designed to provide occupational and life skills, and causing many women have become main caretakers for extended families in crowded and underfunded environments as social systems struggle, adding to their emotional and physical load.

South Sudanese women have also been a factor in promoting societal cohesiveness and peace. Though usually left out of official political venues, South Sudanese women lead front-stage in efforts at peacebuilding and reconstruction. There has been collective action to demand greater representation in formal peace negotiations and advocate for gender-sensitive rebuilding efforts that recognize women's unique experiences during conflict.

Militarization and traditional bridewealth practices have also played significant roles in exacerbating women's vulnerabilities during the conflict.

== Health and education ==
Throughout South Sudan, many women lack the ability and opportunity for education and health resources. According to the World Bank, 51% of the population in South Sudan is living under the poverty line. In turn, many women in South Sudan are not provided the opportunity to go to school so they can stay at home and help their families and as a result are illiterate. Steps have been taken to allow more children to go to school, such as South Sudan's Ministry of Education, Science and Technology creating an education system for girls. While the steps taken by the Ministry of Education, Science and Technology have created an increase in school attendance, there are still a number of children, especially girls, who are unable to attend school due to their family's inability to send them. According to the 2006 Household Health Survey, 46% of women with no education are married before age 18. Many of these women are married off rather than attending school and becoming educated.

Illiteracy and limited education also tie into women in South Sudan's inability to protect themselves from sexually transmitted infections. Only 3% of women without formal education and 2% of women from the poorest area use a form of contraception, compared to the 22% of the wealthiest area. The lack of education of women in this area ties directly into their health. Less than half of the women in South Sudan have heard of HIV/AIDS and well over 50% of women are unaware of ways to prevent the disease. Also, many women and girls have to drop out of school to be married and are therefore not given the opportunity to learn.

According to the 2006 Sudan Household Survey, a mother's level of education plays a role on the child's weight. 35% of children from mothers with no formal education were underweight, whereas only 19% of children from mothers with secondary level education were underweight. The survey also found that on average 14% of children in South Sudan are severely underweight. The mean percent of children from South Sudan who are severely stunted is 18%.

Additionally, girls' access to education across South Sudan is the conflict. Widespread insecurity, displacement, and the prioritizing of immediate survival requirements cause education for females to be either completely stopped or interrupted. Programs meant to empower teenage girls through life skills and vocational training have had little success in conflict-torn regions, according to, since instability compromises ongoing involvement and safety. Early marriage, motivated by poverty and uncertainty, lowers even more the likelihood of girls continuing their education. Lack of educational chances not only limits girls' personal growth but also reduces their future political involvement and financial independence.This therefore raises the urgent need for greater assistance and empowerment initiatives for women and girls in South Sudan.

== Marriage and childbirth ==
Forced marriage and child marriages are very common for women in South Sudan and affect most women in the area. Child marriages are often used as a way for families to recover lost economic resources. Because a woman's family receives a bride price from the husband of their daughter, parents are interested in having their daughters married off at a very early age to whoever offers the most. This bride price is also the reason for why so few women get divorced in South Sudan. If there is a divorce, the family of the wife has to repay the family of the husband the bride price that was originally given for the marriage. Another reason for marrying daughters young is the fear of pregnancy out of wedlock. This causes dishonor for the family and as a result the hope is to marry a daughter before she has this chance. While there are law that prevent child marriages, the government does little to enforce them, so people often do not abide by them.

The belief in this culture is that men control family and political power and women are meant to follow their orders. A woman's role is to give her husband children and these women face pressure from their husband's family members to bear as many children as possible. Pregnancies from child marriages also result in more birth complications than marriages with older women. Many women in South Sudan lack the resources and medical care that they need during their pregnancies, so if there are complications the women may not be saved. As a result, South Sudan has one of the highest maternal death rates following and during pregnancy with a ratio of 789 deaths per 100,000 live births. Because of the lack of contraception use and the fact that women are expected to have as many children as possible, this number does not waver much. A major complication faced by women in South Sudan is obstetric fistula. Approximately 5,000 women in South Sudan have obstetric fistula every year. Fistula is most common in areas where there are not medical resources. This often results in the loss of the child as well as the rejection of the woman by her husband and others.

== Involvement in government ==
Since South Sudan's official declaration of independence on 9 July 2011, 5 out of 29 ministerial positions in the Government of South Sudan had been occupied by South Sudanese women. 10 out of 28 deputy ministers were held by women. The women of the Republic of South Sudan had also been active in liberation causes, by "providing food and shelters" to soldiers and by "caring for children" and by "caring for wounded heroes and heroines" during their political struggle prior to the country's independence. An example was their formation of the Katiba Banat ("women battalion").

== Gender equality ==
Although women's rights and gender equality is legally guaranteed, South Sudan is a highly unequal society. In reality, women and girls continue to face significant barriers to achieving full equality across political, social, economic, and cultural spheres. Deeply rooted patriarchal traditions limit women's participation in leadership, decision-making, and formal employment sectors, while customary practices such as bridewealth and early marriage reinforce gender hierarchies. Educational inequalities are pronounced, with many girls dropping out of school due to poverty, early marriage, and cultural expectations surrounding domestic responsibilities. Access to healthcare remains limited, particularly in rural areas, leading to high maternal mortality rates and limited reproductive rights. Political representation of women remains low despite affirmative action policies, and legal protections for women's rights are often poorly enforced.

Additionally, widespread gender-based violence, compounded by the ongoing impacts of conflict and displacement, continues to undermine women's safety and autonomy. Together, these factors perpetuate systemic inequality, making gender equality a legal promise but a distant reality for many women and girls in South Sudan. Achieving meaningful change requires addressing these interconnected challenges through sustained legal reforms, education initiatives, economic empowerment, and stronger protection against violence. Without significant and coordinated efforts to transform social norms, expand opportunities, and strengthen legal protections, the vision of true gender equality in South Sudan will remain unfulfilled. Empowering women and girls must be central to the country's development, peacebuilding, and long-term stability.

=== Education ===
A great disparity among the genders is their levels of education. The literacy rate for women is 16% while the rate for men is 40%. Moreover, the majority of women never receive an education. In a study of 490 people, it was recorded that 64% of women and 38% of men have never attended school. The leading cause for girls not to go to school is early marriage, while for boys it is the high cost of school fees. In 2013, about 45% of girls were married before the age of 18. This is mostly due to the fact that when marrying, men are required to pay a "bride price" to the bride's family. It is very common to receive cows as a bride price. This is an incentive for families to sell their daughters when they are struggling economically. Additionally, many girls report that their menstrual cycle and lack of access to sanitary towels prevents them from attending schools (41% in this study claim they do not have access). Moreover, the long distances to school and lack of safe sanitation facilities can result in abductions, sexual harassment, and other forms of gender-based violence. The disproportionately low number of female teachers is another barrier to girls education. Less than 10% of teachers here are women, which can decrease the perception of safety in a society where gender-based violence is very high and mostly concentrated toward females and perpetuated by males.

=== Gender-based violence ===
Gender-based violence includes rape, sexual assault, domestic violence, murder, torture, war crimes against children, forced marriage, and other forms of sexual violence. Gender-based violence (GBV) has effected a reported 41% of people in the past year. 70% of people report knowing someone who has been a victim. Since conflict broke out in 2013, about 20% of girls and women have been raped or sexually assaulted and more than half of the accused perpetrators are uniformed police or soldiers. However, multiple studies show that sexual violence incidents are majorly underreported. Additionally, it is proven that civil unrest increases GBV amongst all populations. From 2016 to 2017, reported incidents of sexual violence increased by 60%.

=== Gender roles ===
Gender inequality and strict gender roles are maintained by the strict patriarchal social system. This generally marginalizes women out of roles of power and productive wage-paying jobs. Women are expected to take on the role as the caretaker of the household. They bare the role of providing food and sanitized water for the household. They are expected to care for children, the elderly, and the sick. Consequently, the second leading reason girls do not go to school is due to increased care work. Due to the increased displacement of people being affected by the conflict, women are taking on extra care-taking responsibilities since the members of their households have increased. Accordingly, the conflict has increased their reproductive responsibilities which has further limited their access to education, political participation, and other activities. In addition, women are more susceptible to food insecurity and malnutrition as they are culturally and socially expected to refuse food in order to provide more for the rest of the family.

=== Political participation vs. customary laws ===
South Sudan has relatively high female political participation in comparison to other African countries. Currently, 29% of parliament seats are held by women. However, the number of women in governor and ministry positions are disproportionately very low. Men still hold the vast majority of these more powerful government roles. Consequently, women have little to none decision-making power in the private as well as the public sector. Men and boys are identified as making the most decisions in the household and in their communities. Women will make a decision on behalf of a man's absence.

Many laws and customary legal practices maintain women's inferiority. This can be seen when comparing adultery laws and implementation. Women are convicted without substantial evidence and may be imprisoned for eight months to a year. In comparison, men are rarely prosecuted. Additionally, while domestic violence is illegal, it is socially accepted that a man discipline his wife and they are rarely charged with it as a crime. 82% of women and 81% of men agreed that domestic violence against women "should be tolerated in order to keep the family together".

In 2017, South Sudan joined the United Nations and signed the Geneva convention which transnationally establishes human rights. However, they have not yet ratified and implemented the United Nations Convention on the Elimination of all forms of Discrimination against women (CEDAW): an optional clause that more specifically institutes gender equality. Notwithstanding, South Sudan does have additional legal structures in place to promote women's rights. The National Gender Policy legally guarantees gender equality and protections. This policy also establishes affirmative action in order to ensure women political participation. They have several objectives and strategies to enact social, economic, and legal equality for women. The gender-specific clauses are:

- Women shall be accorded full and equal dignity of the person with men.
- Women shall have the right to equal pay for equal work and other related benefits with men.
- Women shall have the right to participate equally with men in public life.

Additionally, they are bonded to the Protocol to the African Charter on Human and People's Rights on the Rights of Women in Africa, also known as the Maputo Protocol, which establishes that women's rights are human rights.

== See also ==
- Educational inequalities in South Sudan
- Education in South Sudan
- Demographics of South Sudan
- Prostitution in South Sudan
- Women in Africa
