= The Bridge University =

Coordinates: 4.83500°N 31.60000°E

The Bridge University (TBU)
- Type: Private
- Established: 2009
- Chancellor: Bior Ajang Duot (Council Chairman)
- Vice-Chancellor: Dr. Andrew Anthony Cula
- Administrative staff: 65+ (2011)
- Students: 3,000+ (2011)
- Location: Juba, South Sudan
- Campus: Urban
- Website: www.thebridgeuniversity.com

The Bridge University (TBU) is a university in South Sudan.

== Location ==
The campus of The Bridge University is in the Altabara B neighborhood, in the city of Juba, the capital of South Sudan and the largest city in that country. This location lies in the city's southeastern section, close to the White Nile River, where the road to Nimule (A43) crosses over it. The approximate coordinates of the university campus are 4° 50' 6.00"N, 31° 36' 0.00"E (Latitude: 4.83500; Longitude: 31.60000). The coordinates are approximate because the university campus does not yet show on most publicly available maps.

== History ==
The Bridge University was founded in 2009 as a post-secondary college. However, after one semester, the administration upgraded to a full university to meet the overwhelming demand for instruction. As of July 2011, the university has over 3,000 students enrolled, with over 65 full-time lecturers and over 45 part-time staff. The university offers certificates, diplomas and first-degree courses.

== Academic units ==
As of July 2011, the university maintains the following faculties, departments and institutes:

1. Faculty of Humanities & Social Sciences
2. Faculty of Business Administration & Management
3. Faculty of Science
4. Department of Computer Science
5. Department of Business Studies
6. Department of Law
7. Department of Languages
8. Department of Health Sciences
9. Institute for Social Research
10. Institute of Open and Distance Learning

== Academic courses ==
As of July 2011, the university offers the following courses:

Undergraduate degree courses

- Bachelor of International Relations & Diplomacy
- Bachelor of Public Administration & Management
- Bachelor of Development Studies
- Bachelor of Human Resources Management
- Bachelor of Project Planning & Management
- Bachelor of Social Work & Social Administration
- Bachelor of Accounting & Finance
- Bachelor of Statistics & Applied Economics
- Bachelor of Business Administration
- Bachelor of Micro Finance
- Bachelor of Procurement & Logistics Management
- Bachelor of Business Administration in Economics & International Finance
- Bachelor of Laws

Undergraduate diploma courses

- Diploma in Public Administration & Management
- Diploma in Mass Communication
- Diploma in Development Studies
- Diploma in Human Resources Management
- Diploma in Project Planning & Management
- Diploma in Social Work & Social Administration
- Diploma in Accounting & Finance
- Diploma in Business Administration
- Diploma in Procurement & Logistics Management
- Diploma in Economics & International Finance
- Diploma in Information Technology
- Diploma in Secondary Education
- Diploma in Primary Education
- Diploma in Laboratory Science
- Diploma in Health Service Management

Postgraduate courses

The university does not yet offer postgraduate courses.

Certificate courses

TBU offers a variety of short courses which last from a few weeks to several months, leading to the award of a certificate. Some of the certificate courses include:

1. Certificate in computer hardware maintenance
2. Oracle 9i
3. PL/SQL Database programming.
4. Advanced certificate in Computer Networking.
5. Certificate in dynamic web design.
6. Certificate in Computer Applications.
7. Certificate in Statistical Data Analysis Using SPSS

== See also ==
- Juba, South Sudan
- Central Equatoria
- Equatoria
- Education in South Sudan
- List of universities in South Sudan
