= University of Northern Bahr El-Ghazal =

South Sudan University

University of Aweil
- Type: Public
- Established: 2011; 15 years ago
- Vice-Chancellor: Prof. Stephen Chol Ajongo
- Administrative staff: (2011)
- Students: (2011)
- Location: Aweil, South Sudan; 8.77515°N 27.41020°E
- Campus: Urban
- Website: Homepage

University of Aweil formerly University of Northern Bahr el Ghazal (UNBEG) is a university in South Sudan.

The Vice Chancellor of the University of Northern Bahr El-Ghazal is Prof. Stephen Chol Ajongo

== Location ==
The university is located in the city of Aweil, in Aweil West County, Northern State, in the Bahr el Ghazal Region, in northwestern South Sudan, near the International border with the Republic of Sudan. Its location lies approximately 800 kilometres (500 mi), by road, northwest of Juba, the capital and largest city in the country.

== History ==
The university was established in 2011, as a government-supported institution of higher education, to address the educational requirements of the following communities in the following order: (a) Northern Bahr el Ghazal State (b) Bahr el Ghazal Region (c) Southern Sudan (d) Interested Qualified International Students. The first class of students was expected to begin classes in October 2011.

== Overview ==
Rumbek University scheduled to open its doors in October 2011. The first Vice Chancellor of the university is Professor John Apuruot Akec. The university is a public university. The list of public universities in the country includes the following:

1. Juba National University in Juba; 1977
2. Rumbek University in Rumbek; 2010
3. Upper Nile University in Malakal; 1991
4. University of Bahr El-Ghazal in Wau and
5. University of Northern Bahr El-Ghazal in Aweil; 2011

== See also ==
- Aweil
- Northern Bahr el Ghazal
- Bahr el Ghazal
- Education in South Sudan
- List of universities in South Sudan
