= Timothy Taban Juch =

South Sudanese politician

Member of the National Legislative Assembly for Akobo County
- Incumbent
- Assumed office 20 May 2010

Governor of Akobo State
- In office 19 August 2019 – 22 February 2020
- Preceded by: Johnson Gony Bilieu
- Succeeded by: position dissolved

Timothy Taban Juch (also spelled Timothy Taban Juc) is a South Sudanese politician and a member of parliament (MP) for Akobo County in Jonglei State. Taban was the governor of Akobo State in South Sudan from 2019 until its dissolution in 2020.

== Military career ==
A Lou Nuer, Taban was a commander in the majority-Nuer South Sudan Liberation Movement (SSLM) during the Second Sudanese Civil War. Taban's forces were based in the Akobo area and fought with the Sudan People's Liberation Army for control of the town.

== Political career ==
Taban was the Jonglei State minister for information and communication before the independence of South Sudan. Taban ran as an independent in the 2010 Southern Sudanese general election, beating SPLM candidate John Luk Jok to become the member of parliament (MP) for Akobo South. While serving as an MP, he was appointed the commissioner of Akobo County in 2014. Taban then became the deputy governor of Eastern Bieh State, and was appointed governor of Akobo State on August 19, 2019 after the death of Johnson Gony Bilieu on July 4, 2019. Taban appointed his cabinet on September 25, 2019. During his time as governor, severe floods in the state led to food insecurity and caused some residents to flee to Bieh State.
