= Rumbek University =

University in South Sudan

- Motto: Knowledge is light and Empowerment
- Type: Government university
- Established: 2010; 16 years ago
- Chancellor: Dr. Salva Kiir (President of South Sudan)
- Vice-Chancellor: Prof. Dr.Alier Maker Ghai Duk
- Administrative staff: 100 (2021)
- Students: 1,500 (2021)
- Location: Rumbek, South Sudan; 6.80000°N 29.68750°E
- Campus: Urban

Rumbek University (or RU) is a university in South Sudan.

== Location ==
The university's temporary campus is housed on the premises of Rumbek Secondary School, in the town of Rumbek (estimated population in 2008 was 32,100). The UNICEF compound in Rumbek is situated in Rumbek Central County, Lakes State in central South Sudan. This location lies 377 kilometres (234 mi), by road, northwest of Juba, the capital and largest city. The coordinates of the campus are: 6° 48' 0.00"N, 20° 41' 15.00"E (Latitude: 6.80000; Longitude: 29.68750). A permanent campus is under construction in Abinajok, a suburb of Rumbek.

== History ==
The concept of establishing Rumbek University was adopted in February 2006 when the president of the Republic of Sudan Omer Al-Bashir visited Rumbek and pledged to build a university in the town. Subsequently the project was approved at the Sudanese federal level in Khartoum and at the regional level in Juba. The university was established in 2010 as a joint project between the federal government in Khartoum and the Southern Government in Juba. Following South Sudan's independence in July 2011, the university is now the responsibility of the government of South Sudan.

== Overview ==
Rumbek University opened its doors in 2010, with 500 students and 40 academic faculties. The university is a public university. Since the founding of the university, a fifth public university has been established. The list of public universities in the country includes the following:

- Juba National University in Juba; 1977
- Rumbek University in Rumbek; 2010
- Upper Nile University in Malakal; 1991
- University of Bahr El-Ghazal in Wau and
- University of Northern Bahr El-Ghazal in Aweil; 2011

== Academic Colleges ==
The university maintains the following faculties:

- College of Education
- College of Economic and Social Studies
- College of Agriculture
- College of Veterinary medicine and

College of Rural Development and Community Studies

== See also ==
- Rumbek
- Lakes (state)
- Bahr el Ghazal
- Education in South Sudan
- List of universities in South Sudan
