= Yei Agricultural and Mechanical University =

University in South Sudan

Coordinates: 4.10383°N 30.68696°E

- Established: July 2011; 15 years ago
- Location: Yei, Central Equatoria, South Sudan

Yei Agricultural and Mechanical University (YA&MU) is a university in South Sudan.

== Location ==
The university is located in the city of Yei, in Yei River County, Central Equatoria, South Sudan. The city of Yei is the capital of Yei River County and is the second-largest city in the Greater Equatoria Region of South Sudan, after Juba, the national capital. Yei lies 170 kilometres (110 mi), by road, southwest of Juba.

== Overview ==
The university was established in Yei, prior to the independence of South Sudan in July 2011; 15 years ago.

== See also ==
- Education in South Sudan
- Equatoria
- Juba
- List of universities in South Sudan
- Western Equatoria
