= UBG =

UBG may refer to:

- Unabhängige Bürger Gauting
- University of Bahr El-Ghazal
- Utama Banking Group
