= Marial Awou =

South Sudanese Academician (1958–2023)

- Born: Marial Awou Yul; January 15, 1958
- Died: September 14, 2023 (aged 65); New Delhi, India
- Citizenship: South Sudanese
- Occupations: Academic; Economist; Politician

Academic background
- Education: University of Gezira, Vanderbilt University, Universiti Putra Malaysia

Academic work
- Discipline: Economist
- Institutions: Upper Nile University

Marial Awou Yul was born on (15 January 1958 – 14 September 2023) was a South Sudanese economist and academician. He served as the vice-chancellor of Upper Nile University from 2019 until he died in 2023. He also served as deputy minister of Finance and Economic Planning in the first government of independent South Sudan and was previously dean of the School of Social and Economic Studies at the University of Juba.

== Early life and education ==
He obtained a Bachelor of Science degree in Economics from the University of Gezira in 1984. In 1992, he earned a Master of Arts degree from Vanderbilt University in the United States. He later completed a Doctor of Philosophy in Economics at Universiti Putra Malaysia.

== Career ==
Following his graduation from the University of Gezira, Awou joined the University of Juba as a teaching assistant in the Department of Economics. After completing his master's degree, he returned to Sudan and taught economics before undertaking doctoral studies in Malaysia.

After earning his doctorate, he served as an assistant professor at the University of Juba and later worked as a contract lecturer at Universiti Putra Malaysia. In 2009, he joined the World Bank as a senior consultant on monetary and exchange-rate policy, where he was assigned to the Central Bank of Sudan.Before the independence of South Sudan, Awou served as a state minister of Finance in the Government of Sudan. Following South Sudan's independence in 2011, he was appointed deputy minister of Finance and Economic Planning in the country's first post-independence government.

Awou later returned to academia and served as dean of the School of Social and Economic Studies at the University of Juba before being appointed vice-chancellor of Upper Nile University in January 2019.

== Death ==
On the 14 September, 2023. Awou died in New Delhi, India while receiving medical treatment at the age of 65. His body was returned to South Sudan on the 22 of September, 2023.
