= Educational inequalities in South Sudan =

Educational inequalities in South Sudan can be attributed to a number of factors. The lack of funds and infrastructure, along with a poor and mostly illiterate population makes establishing an effective education system challenging. There are also certain traditional cultural ideas about women which make it more difficult for girls to get an education than their male counterparts.

== History of education in South Sudan ==
As a British colony from 1899 to 1956, there was not much effort on the part of the imperial power to establish schools. Catholic and Protestant missionaries provided limited schooling. However, these schools were taught in the vernacular which did not help children become permanently literate. After Sudan's independence in 1956, the ineffective church-run schools were shut down in a wave of Islamisation. New nationalized schools were created, and schools used Arabic instead of local languages. The new schools were also inaccessible to most of the population. The educational opportunities became even more dismal once the civil war broke out. The on-and-off civil warfare devastated educational prospects for generations of Sudanese, due to high costs, lack of buildings, and insecurity. Since the Comprehensive Peace Agreement of 2005 parents are pushing for their children to attend school. While facilities are still widely lacking, 500 new schools have been built. These new structures serve the 1.4 million children who are now attending primary school, which is a two-fold increase from five years ago. South Sudan's official independence in 2011 left Africa's newest country without a basic infrastructure in place, with some of the worst human development indicators in the world.

== Challenges ==
Many issues prevent the educational infrastructure in South Sudan from reaching its full potential, including poverty, governmental failures, ongoing violence, poor health of its citizens, and inaccessibility to schools that are overcrowded, underfunded, and operated by unqualified teachers. South Sudan has the worst gender equality in education in the world.

=== General challenges ===
Poverty and lack of government funds greatly limits the extent to which education can be improved. According to the World Bank, more than half of the South Sudanese people live below the poverty line. The government of South Sudan lacks the money and institutional framework to offer much help. South Sudan is rich in natural resources with oil as their main export, representing 98% of government revenue. However, recently oil exports have been completely cut off, due to a high tax which Sudan sought to levy upon oil flowing through their pipelines. It is predicted that the educational budget could be decreased dramatically. The inability of the government to fund schools leads to high education costs that most families cannot afford. An additional challenge faced by students in certain regions like Warrap and Upper Nile is the continual fighting between different factions. Conflict displaces citizens and unhinges government services. In 2008, there were 300,000 such refugees in South Sudan. These regions with ongoing violence are bound to suffer more later because, as Jeffrey Sachs has stated, conflict disallows children from attending school and building the skills needed to be a productive society member. Conversely, many refugees from the civil war are returning in droves to South Sudan. Only established in 2011, South Sudan's infrastructure is not up to par yet. However the repatriates put an even greater strain on the slim resources. Many of these refugees had received better education during their time in refugee camps in places like Kenya. The result is that this influx of more educated persons is increasing the overall Net Literacy rates of South Sudan. Challenges faced in the classrooms include language disparities, un-unified curriculum, teacher absenteeism, teachers who are untrained, and overcrowded classrooms. South Sudan had decided to use English as the preferred language in schools. Currently teachers lack English educational material or the capability to teach in that language. There is presently no unified standard of curriculum for the whole country. This leads to differences in outcome for the students. Teacher absenteeism has also been shown to be an issue where in certain areas of the country, very little time is actually spent learning in the classroom. Even when teachers are present, there is a good chance that the teacher is untrained. Estimates show that as many as 7,500 teachers are not qualified to teach primary school. Overcrowding is yet another problem in classrooms, and in 2009, it was judged that there were on average 129 students per classroom.

=== Additional challenges for girls ===
While all of the above described issues apply generally to students in South Sudan, certain cultural practices add greater difficulty for girls seeking education at any level. South Sudan currently has one of the lowest globally ranked levels of gender equality in the world. Two of the biggest reasons for girls dropping out of school include early marriage and early pregnancy. The dowry associated with marriage can be a lucrative incentive for parents to marry their daughters off at an early age. This practice is especially common in rural areas. Prioritization of boys' education over girls' leads to girls being removed from school earlier. If a family cannot afford to send all of their children to school, the interests of the boys' education will be favored. Further, girls' domestic responsibilities within the household increase with age, which leaves less time for girls to attend school and to study. Violence can be a deterrent for parents considering sending their daughters to school in South Sudan. If the distance to school is large, fear of attacks by men while on the way to or from school is a huge concern. Lack of facilities also prevents girls from attending school. Most schools do not have separate latrines for girls, and those without access to sanitary napkins are more likely to not attend school while menstruating.

With a 16% female literacy rate, South Sudan ranks lowest in the world. Two-thirds of the approximately two million illiterate South Sudanese are women and a girl is more likely to die in pregnancy or childbirth than to graduate from primary school. In 2005, the female:male enrollment rate in primary school was 35:100.

== Institutional levels of education available to women ==
=== Primary and secondary schools ===
Girls are more likely to be enrolled later and removed from primary school earlier than their male student counterparts. Primary schools have a male graduation rate of about 16%, while girls' graduation rates lag behind at 9%. For the reasons discussed above, girls are at a clear disadvantage in education. Completing secondary school has been found to deter early marriage and provide opportunity for girls by producing skilled workers.

=== Higher education ===
During the civil war, the four major universities in South Sudan relocated to Khartoum. Since independence, the universities have been slowly moving back to the region. The process is hindered by the cost of rebuilding, and many faculty members are unwilling to move to South Sudan, where the cost of living is significantly higher. Other challenges include the increasing enrollment rates, a 50% increase to 6,000 at the University of Juba from the '08/'09 school year to the '09/'10 school year. The universities are not yet equipped with the facilities to operate with so many students. Available facilities for on-campus housing are insubstantial and this can be a deterrent to parents sending daughters to receive a university education. Safety and protection worries are still an issue at this level of education for women. The complete lack of latrines for women on campus can be another barrier to high education. Some women have found that having higher education is also an obstacle to their marriage prospects. Some traditionalists believe that women should not be educated, and others are dissuaded by the assumed increase in dowry price that would come with a more educated woman.

== International and NGO involvement ==
International involvement in South Sudan's education reform has been vast, including various United Nations agencies, NGOs, and individual Western countries. While these efforts have been met with mild successes like the increase in enrollment, a much greater commitment will be required to bring South Sudan up to international standards. Some of the major donors include the United States, the United Kingdom, the Netherlands, the European Union, and Norway. These donors typically allocate their money to building classrooms, sending textbooks, and training teachers in areas affected by conflict. Teacher training institutions are particularly effective long-term, because they can affect exponential change. One trained teacher can make a difference to a multitude of students. While these modest improvements are significant, international aid has been criticized for being too little, and too slow to take effect.

=== Future development plans ===
The Millennium Development Goals are a cornerstone to South Sudan's future plans for education. The plan is to be within reach of the goals by 2015. The Constitution of South Sudan has a provision for "free and compulsory education at the primary level." South Sudan also seeks to build more secondary schools, increase access to education for adults and adolescents, improve the quality of education, and close the gender gap in education through scholarships for girls. In April 2012, South Sudan became a member of the World Bank after several years in the application process. The new membership status allowed for the creation of the South Sudan Transition Fund, amounting to 75 million (USD). Current plans by major donors include:

- United States: 30 million (USD) program to build three teacher training facilities
- United Kingdom: South Sudan Education Programmes plans for the building of 32 primary and 4 secondary schools, the delivery of millions of textbooks, and to target impediments to girls' education
- European Union: plans for 100 new schools to be built

The biggest problem facing these international aid efforts is underfunding. There is a large gap between what South Sudan will require to meet the Millennium Development Goals by 2015 and the amount of international aid received by South Sudan. This gap amounts to about 400 million (USD) annually, most of which would be used to build schools, and post-2015 this cost would greatly decrease.

== See also ==
- Education in South Sudan
- List of universities in South Sudan
- These Girls Are Missing, a documentary film about the gender gap in education in Africa
