= St. Mary's University in Juba =

University in Juba, South Sudan

Coordinates: 4.8459°N 31.6067°E

- Established: 15 April 2009; 17 years ago
- Religious affiliation: Catholic Church
- Location: Juba, Central Equatoria, South Sudan

Saint Mary's College in Juba (SMUJ) is a university in Juba, in Juba County, Central Equatoria, in South Sudan. The city of Juba is the capital of South Sudan and is the largest city in that country.

== History ==
St. Mary's University College was founded on 15 April 2009, as a collaborative effort between the South Sudanese Roman Catholic Archdiocese, with the cooperation of the Volunteers' Organization for International Co-operation OVCI la Nostra Famiglia (International non-governmental organization INGO, AVSI, Ministry of Gender, Social Welfare and Religious Affairs which has been continuously working in South Sudan since 1983). Enrollment is open to all eligible citizens of South Sudan and foreign nationals residing in the Republic of South Sudan. The Chancellor of the university was late emeritus Paulino Lukudu Loro, the Roman Catholic Archbishop of Juba. The cureent Chancelor is His Eminence Prof.Stephen Cardinal Ameyu Martin Mula, the metropolitan Archbishop of Archdiocese of Juba saint. Mary's University added a new Faculty of Human Development in 2019.

== Academic affairs ==
The university opened with two (2) faculties, namely:

1. School of Rehabilitation Sciences
2. School of Education
3. School of Human Development
4. School of Economics and Administrative Sciences

== See also ==
- Juba
- Juba County
- Central Equatoria
- Equatoria
- Education in South Sudan
- List of universities in South Sudan
- saint Mary's University Admission Form
