= University of Bahr El-Ghazal =

Educational institution in South Sudan

University of Bahr El-Ghazal (UBG)
- Motto: المعرفةإزدهار
- Motto in English: Knowledge is Prosperity
- Type: Public
- Established: 1991; 35 years ago
- Vice-Chancellor: Prof. Dr. Erneo Bernardo Ochi
- Administrative staff: (2017)
- Students: 2,000+ (2020)
- Location: Wau, South Sudan; 7.73447°N 27.99145°E
- Campus: Urban

University of Bahr El-Ghazal (UBG) is a university in South Sudan located in Wau, the capital of Western Bahr El Ghazal State. It was established in 1991.

== Location ==
The university is located in the city of Wau, in Wau County, Wau State in the Bahr El Ghazal Region in the northwestern part of South Sudan. It is 650 kilometres (400 miles) northwest of Juba, the capital and largest city.

== History ==
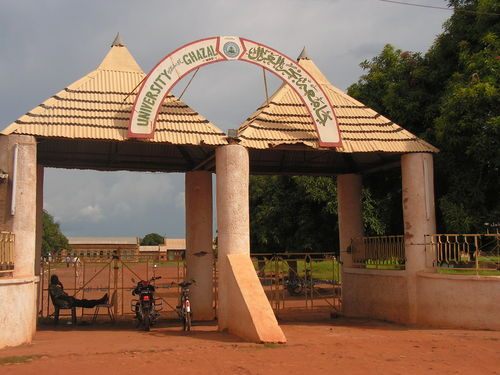
University of Bahr El-Ghazal in 2009

UBG is a public university. It was established in 1991, in response to the educational needs of the citizens of South Sudan. It is one of the five public universities in the country, the other four being:

- Juba National University in Juba
- John Garang Memorial University in Bor
- Alexandria University in Tonj
- Rumbek University in Rumbek
- University of Northern Bahr El-Ghazal in Aweil
- Upper Nile University in Malakal

The incumbent vice chancellor of the University of Bahr El-Ghazal is Prof. Dr. Erneo Bernardo Ochi, replacing Professor. Dr. Victor Laku Kwajok. In 2020, Awut Deng Acuil was appointed as the chair of the council of the university, the first woman to head a university in South Sudan.

== Colleges ==
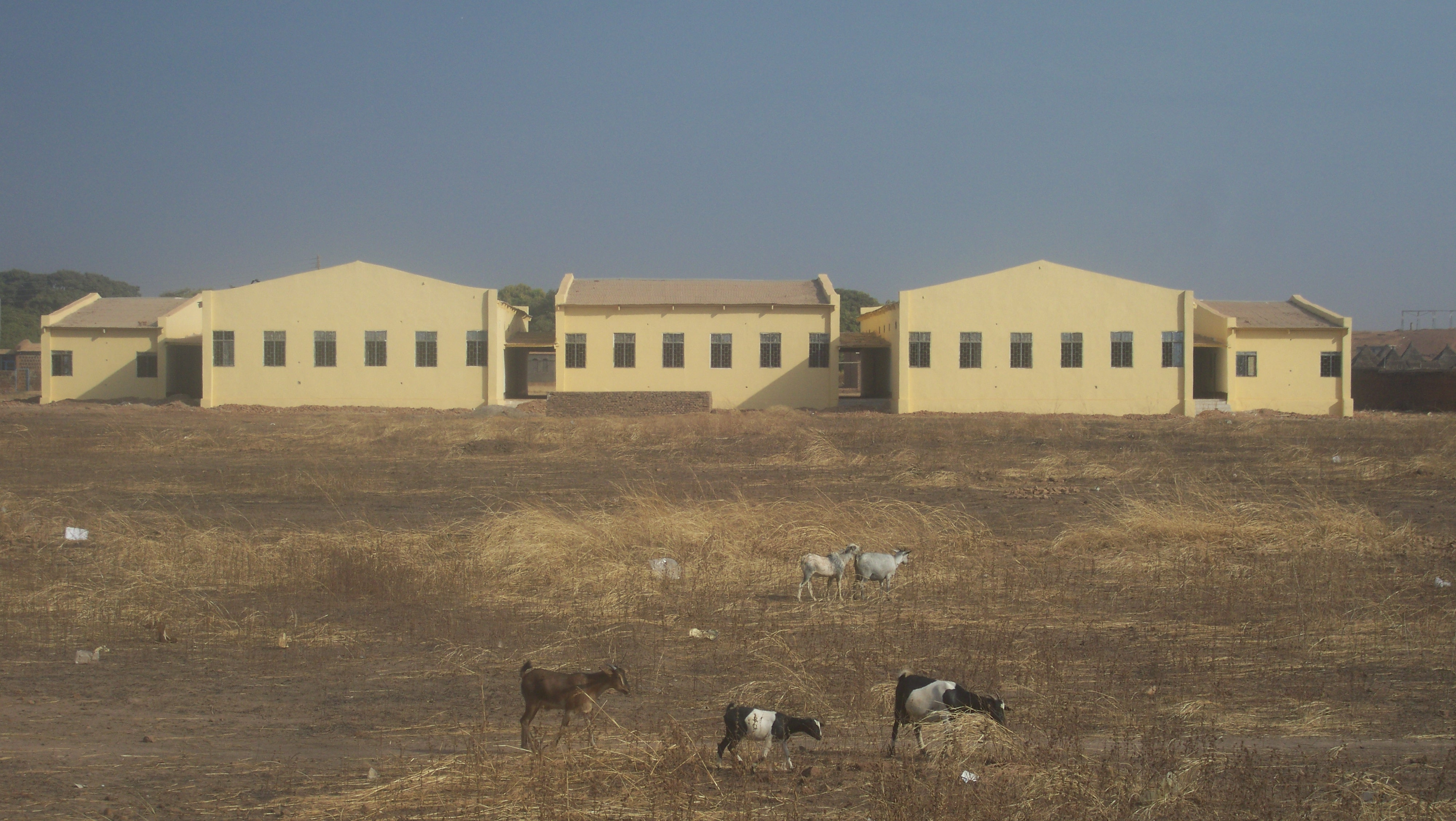
New building, University of Bahr el-Ghazal

As of December 2016, the university maintained the following colleges:

- College of Medicine and Health Sciences (CMHS)
- Institute of Public Health and Environmental Sciences
- College of Economics and Social Studies
- College of Education
- College of Veterinary Sciences
- College of Agriculture (2018)
- Intermediate Diploma Program (3 year diploma)

== See also ==
- Education in South Sudan
- List of universities in South Sudan
