= Paulino Lukudu Obede =

South Sudanese politician (born 1990)

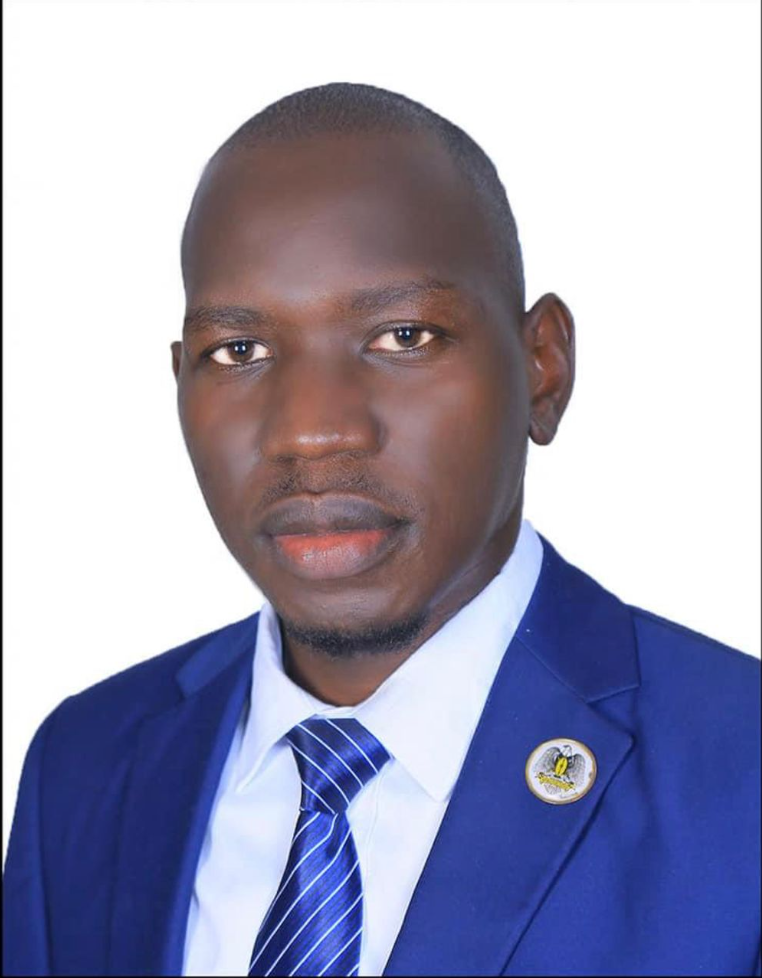
A portrait of Paulino Lukudu

Paulino Lukudu Obede (born on 17 September 1990) is a South Sudanese politician. He is currently the Deputy Governor for Central Equatoria State in the Revitalized Transitional Government of National Unity (RTGoNU) as of 2024. Paulino is one of the youngest South Sudanese to be appointed to a gubernatorial post at 34. Lukudu has previously served as Minister for Information for Central Equatoria, a member of the South Sudan National Dialogue, and a member of the Transitional National Legislature (Council of States) which is equivalent to Senate in other countries. He served as an MP among the appointees of the Other Political Parties on 17 September 2021, and later in 2023 became the Chief Whip of the Other Political Parties (OPP). Chief Whip is the Chairperson of the Party's Parliamentary Caucus. until his elevation to the position of Deputy Governor.

He is also the leader of United South Sudan Party (USSP), a registered political party in South Sudan. He replaced Clement Mbugoniwia, who was the Chairperson of the party.

== Early life and education ==
Paulino Lukudu Obede was born in Juba County of Central Equatoria State to Mr. Obede Ladu Laila Porun and Reida Juan Bullen Ladu, all from Loka West in Lainya County of Central Equatoria

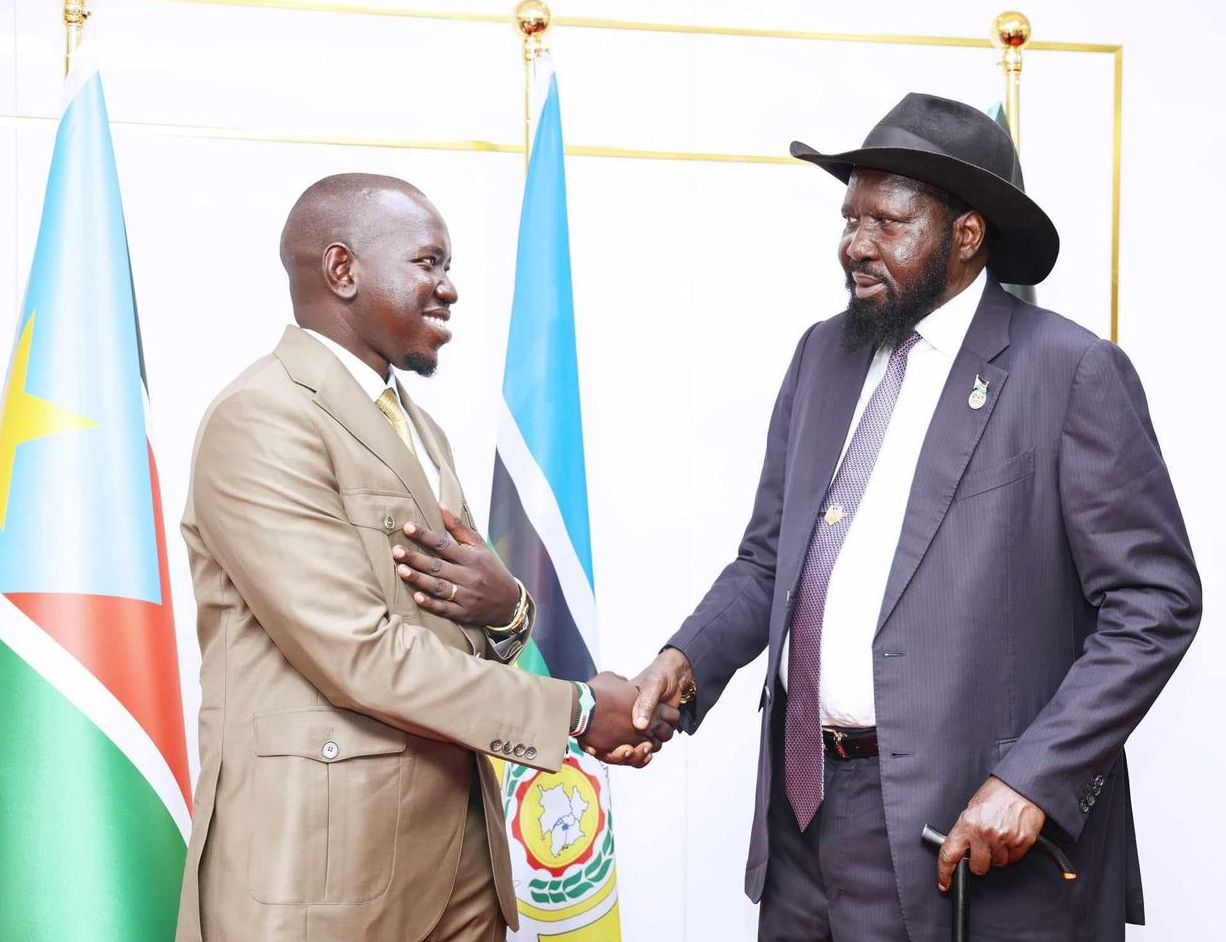
Paulino Lukudu, Deputy Governor Central Equatoria State & President Salva Kiir shake hands during swearing-in ceremony of Paulino at the Office of the President

State. He is a first born in a family of seven siblings.

Paulino started his early education in Juba in 1997 from St. Kizito Primary School where he completed Primary Leaving Examinations in 2005. He later joined Juba Day Secondary School and finished Sudan School Certificate in 2009. He later joined University of Juba and graduated with Diploma in Faculty of Economics and Social Studies department of Political Science.

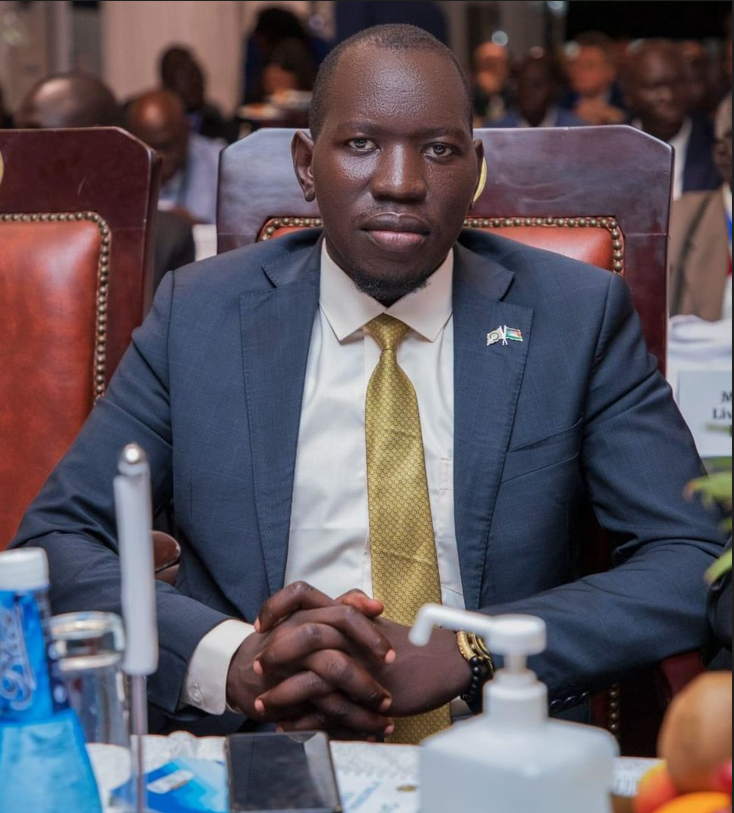
A picture of Paulino Lukudu Obede, Deputy Governor Central Equatoria State

== Career ==
In 2017 Paulino was a member of the National Dialogue Steering Committee and he became the youngest member of the steering committee. the national dialogue was constituted by H.E the President of the Republic of South Sudan with the intention to find solution for economic, social cohesion, political and security challenges facing the country.

Mr. Lukudu is the first former Minister of Information for Central Equatoria State in the Revitalized Transitional Government of National Unity.

He was appointed Minister of Information and Communication for Central Equatoria State in February 2021 when the state government structures were formed.

Lukudu then got suspended indefinitely from his position about three months later by the Governor of Central Equatoria, Emmanuel Adil, with no reason provided.

Paulino Lukudu is also the Youngest Influential Leader of the United South Sudan Party or USSP, a registered political party in the country and a member of the National Alliance Political Parties under OPP. USSP was formed by the group of South Sudanese based in London in 2004 under the then leadership of Hon. Clement Juma. Lukudu became the second leader of USSP in 2017 one year after the crises of 2016 which affected the political landscape in the country. Lukudu climbed the leadership of the party through different stages of Youth League Leader in 2011, Deputy Secretary General in 2015 to Party's Leader in 2017 till now.
