= Catholic University of South Sudan =

Coordinates: 7.6757°N 27.9950°E

- Established: 29 September 2008; 18 years ago
- Religious affiliation: Catholic Church
- Students: 250 ^{(2008-2009)}

The Catholic University of South Sudan (CUofSS) is a university located in South Sudan. CUofSS consists of two campuses; one in the capital of Juba, the other in Wau. The university is fairly new as it was established and operating since 2008. However, the university was founded approximately three years before the independence of South Sudan.

== History ==
In July 2007, five bishops from Sudan decided to establish a Catholic university that would have campuses and institutions in both northern and southern Sudan. The Catholic University of South Sudan opened with 50 pioneer students on 29 September 2008, as a private institution of higher education. In its first year of operation of the 2008–2009 academic year, the school enrolled 250 students, which is reported to be a high number for a country like that. The Jesuit Father Michael Schultheis served as its first vice-chancellor (2008–2013), followed by Dr fr. Matthew Pagan Daniel. In 2013, the campus in Wau started a project establishing new areas of study, including mineralogy and mining studies. The campus fully instituted these by 2014.

== Location and faculties ==
The Faculty of Arts and Social Sciences is located in Juba. However, the Faculties of Agricultural and Environmental Sciences and Engineering is based in the city of Wau. The second campus in Wau also offers mining and mineralogy studies, implemented by 2014.

== School description ==
The university offers fine arts classes, including art and social sciences such as peace and conflicts studies, and also science related classes, including agricultural sciences, economic sciences, engineering, mineralogy, and mining classes. The school has a container library, which was donated to the school in 2009.

== See also ==
- Education in South Sudan
- List of universities in South Sudan
