= Upper Nile University =

Upper Nile University (UNU)
- Motto: Excellence, Knowledge, Peace, & Development
- Type: Public
- Established: 1991; 35 years ago
- Vice-Chancellor: Prof. Dr. Mamour C. Turuk
- Administrative staff: 500+ (2025)
- Students: 10,000
- Location: https://www.facebook.com/profile.php?id=61569293035464, Malakal, South Sudan; 09°33′00″N 31°39′30″E
- Campus: Juba, Malakal, Renk area
- Website: unu.edu.ss

Upper Nile University (UNU) is a university in South Sudan.

== Who We Are? ==
Upper Nile University was established in accordance with the decree from the Council of Ministers on the 9th Feb 1991 after passing the University constitution on 6th Nov. 1991. The first Vice Chancellor of the University professor Awad Abu Zed Mukhtar was appointed in November 1991 and the University Council was formed in May 1992. The establishment of Upper Nile University was an additional achievement to the Southern Sudan Universities besides University of Juba and Bahr El Ghazal University.

Upper Nile University is located at the Northern part of Malakal town near Malakal airport in Upper Nile state. It also acts as the center for development programmes in Upper Nile State in particular and South Sudan in general and serves as a center for education and training of qualified cadres both theoretically and practically.

== Location ==
The university's main campus is located in the town of Malakal, Upper Nile State, on the banks of the White Nile. This location is approximately 650 kilometres (400 mi) by road north of Juba, the capital and largest city in that country. The coordinates of the main university campus are: 9 33 00N, 31 39 30E (Latitude: 9.5508; Longitude: 31.6600).

== Overview ==
Upper Nile University is one of the five public universities in South Sudan. The list includes the following institutions:

1. University of Juba in Juba
2. Rumbek University of Science and Technology in Rumbek
3. University of Bahr El-Ghazal in Wau
4. Upper Nile University in Malakal
5. John Garang Memorial University in Bor

NB: University of Northern Bahr El-Ghazal in Aweil, Not yet established, not yet constructed, and not yet opened

== History ==
Upper Nile University was founded in 1991. Due to the Second Sudanese Civil War, some of the university faculties were relocated to Khartoum, Sudan, for the safety of staff, students and infrastructure. Following South Sudan's independence in July 2011, the university is consolidating all activities to its main campus in the city of Malakal, Upper Nile State, in South Sudan's northeast.

== Academics ==
As of July 2011, the university maintains the following faculties:

- Faculty of Agriculture
- Faculty of Animal Production
- Faculty of Arts & Humanities
- Faculty of Computer Science
- Faculty of Education
- Faculty of Forestry
- Faculty of Medicine & Public Health
- Faculty of Nursing
- Faculty of Science
- Faculty of Social Science
- Faculty of Veterinary Medicine
- Faculty of Vocational Education

== Vice chancellors ==
Marial Awou (2019 -2023)

== See also ==
- Malakal
- Upper Nile (state)
- Greater Upper Nile
- Education in South Sudan
- List of universities in South Sudan
