= Akobo State =

State in South Sudan from 2017 to 2020

Akobo
- State
- Akobo in South Sudan, after creation of new states
- Country: South Sudan
- Region: Greater Upper Nile
- Number of counties: 1
- Capital: Bor

Government
  - Governor: Timothy Taban Juch
- Time zone: UTC+3 (EAT)

Akobo was a state in South Sudan that existed between 14 January 2017 and 22 February 2020.

== History ==
Akobo County was separated from Bieh State and made a separate state with the increase in the number of states from 28 to 32 on 14 January 2017. Gabriel Gai Riam was appointed governor on 16 January 2017, after the creation of the state, but was removed and replaced by Johnson Gony Bilieu two days later. Timothy Taban Juch was appointed governor on 19 August 2019 after the death of Johnson Gony Bilieu on 4 July 2019.

Upon its creation, a large part of Akobo State was held by the SPLM-IO.

Akobo experienced heavy flooding in late 2019.

== Demographics ==
Akobo State is inhabited by the Anyuak and the Lou subgroup of the Nuer. Some Anyuak were unhappy with the creation of the state, feeling that it was created for the Lou Nuer, although the feeling was not unanimous among the Anyuak. Anyuak feel betrayed because Akobo is their historical land.
