= Victoria Adhar Arop =

South Sudanese nurse, military officer, and lawmaker

Hon. Gen. Victoria Adhar Arop

Member of the National Legislative Assembly of South Sudan
- Incumbent
- Assumed office 2011

Member of the Southern Sudan Legislative Assembly
- In office 2005–2011

Personal details
- Born: Northern Bahr el Ghazal, Anglo-Egyptian Sudan
- Education: University of Juba

Military service
- Allegiance: South Sudan
- Rank: Major General

Victoria Adhar "Adhardit" Arop Chon is a South Sudanese nurse, military officer and lawmaker who has served in the National Legislative Assembly of South Sudan since 2011 and previously in its predecessor, the Southern Sudan Legislative Assembly, from 2005 to 2011. As of 2023, she chaired the Specialized Committee for Defense and Veterans Affairs and as of 2024 she was the oldest member of the Assembly. She first became known as a member of the military for her service as a medical worker and her support of unaccompanied children, and was called "Mother" by them. She then headed a polio vaccination program in Northern Bahr el Ghazal. She rose to the rank of Brigadier General in 2005, and was promoted to Major General in 2026. She earned her bachelor's degree from the University of Juba in 2022.

== Early life ==
Arop was born in Northern Bahr el Ghazal. While education for women was not generally a priority at that time, she has stated her father encouraged her to complete school and university. However, she dropped out of school at primary three. She married, but was widowed in 1965, as her husband was killed on the front lines of the First Sudanese Civil War. He was well-educated, and insisted that if he died she would provide their children with an education. She became the family's breadwinner, and with support from her parents, returned to school to sit for her secondary examinations. She then became a trained nurse, earning a nursing certification and decided to study midwifery.

== Military ==
In 1982, she traveled from her home in Wau, South Sudan to a refugee camp in Dimma, Ethiopia, where she was assigned the job of overseeing a camp for unaccompanied boys, which she has since recounted as having thirty-eight thousand boys. At the time, she had the rank of sergeant. She worked both to make the camp self-sufficient and to ward off diseases including measles, whooping cough, and meningitis. She also protected the children of the camp from forced recruitment into the South Sudanese army, hiding the older boys in the forest. According to one of the boys, Abraham Awolich, her care was like "one of a mother and her children" and he "never saw her show a sign of being tired". He also credited her with saving the lives of most of the children there, and SBS credited her with saving the lives of thousands. Her care was such that the children referred to her simply as "Mother".

She was very interested in fighting, however. As such, she convinced John Garang to send her to a training academy, where she studied warfare with 539 other soldiers, six of whom were women. She graduated, age 41, in 17th place of the 540, but was not permitted to go to the front lines as she was told she was too old. She then returned to overseeing the camp.

In 1991, rebels against the previous government of Ethiopia began attacking the refugee camp, so Arop organized the evacuation of the camp, refusing to leave the camp until she got every child out. She then led them on a dangerous journey to a place she had been informed was safe, Pakok. However, they ultimately had to leave after just months, and she led them again to the Kakuma Refugee Camp. There, she helped the UN open a feeding center for them.

She was promoted to Captain, then spent the remainder of the war as the head of a polio vaccination campaign funded by the United Nations in Northern Bahr el Ghazal, which posed logistical challenges; vaccines required temperatures under 10C at all times, and temperatures in the state rose up to 50C. However, she spent six years traveling around the roadless state on foot, vaccinating children, and dodging air strikes with a team of soldiers. During this time, she was described as formidable by ReliefWeb. She was promoted to brigadier general in 2005. She was subsequently promoted to Major General by Salva Kiir in 2026.

== Politics ==
She first took office in what was then the Southern Sudan Legislative Assembly after being appointed in 2005: she went on to win election in the 2010 Southern Sudanese general election. She remained in office in the National Legislative Assembly. On May 10, 2021, President Salva Kiir announced that he would appoint her daughter Mary Nyanut Ring Machar to replace her. However, five days before the swearing in, Kiir revoked Machar's appointment and announced Arop would return to the Assembly.

As of 2023, she chaired the Specialized Committee for Defence and Veterans Affairs. As of 2024, she was the oldest member of the Assembly. She has called for the Assembly to audit scholarships provided by the government to ensure that "the children of the widows and poor people" are not left out of receiving them, and has called for cracking down on the illegal sale of guns and bullets. She has also called for further punishment for corrupt individuals.

She decided to go to university after colleagues in the Assembly criticized her for her lack of education, and ultimately earned a bachelor's degree from the University of Juba at its School of Public Administration and Management in 2022.

== Personal life ==
She has at least four children, including politician Agel Ring Machar and pageant director Mary Nyanut Ring Machar. She is also referred to as Adhardit.
