= Kakuma Refugee Camp =

Refugee camp in Kenya

- camp
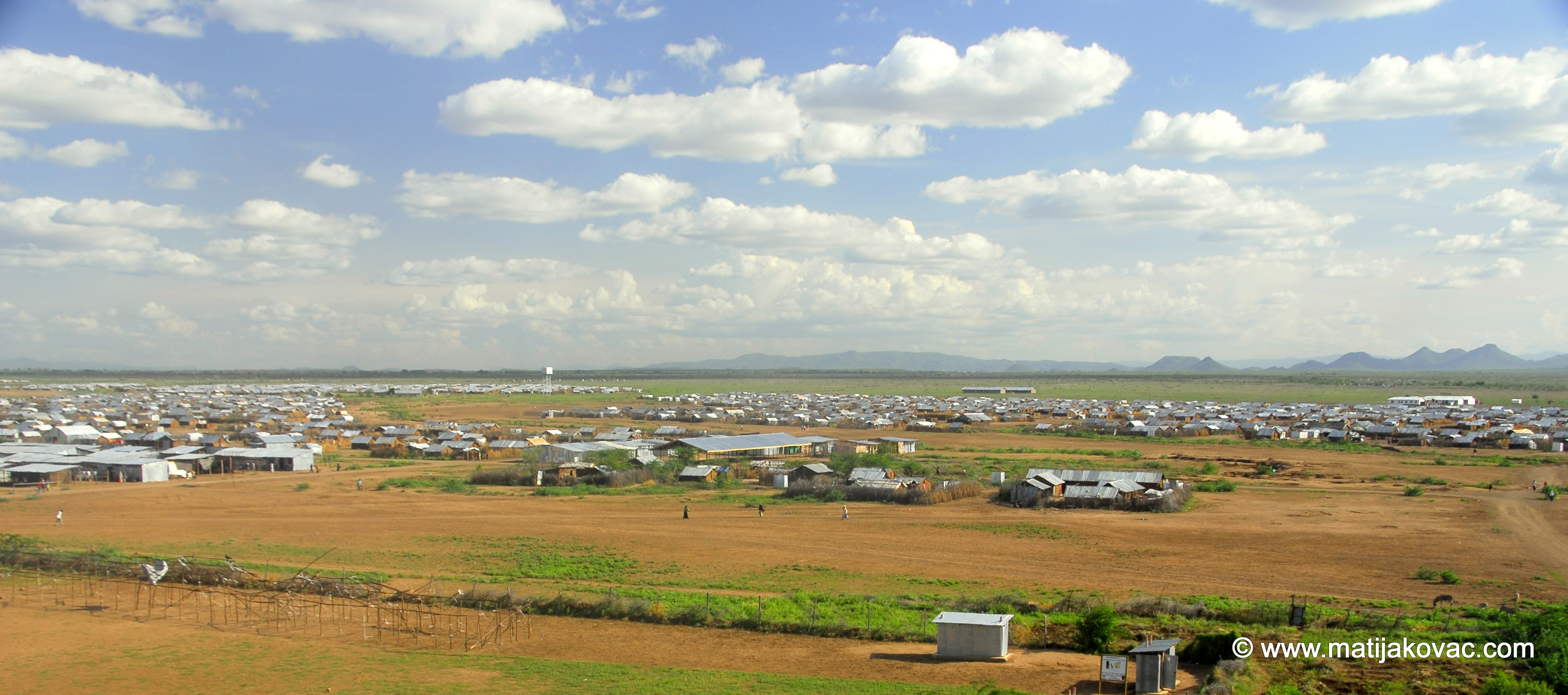
- Kakuma Refugee Camp

- Location in Kenya
- Coordinates: 03°43′N 34°52′E
- Country: Kenya
- County: Turkana County

Population
  - Total: ~200,000

Kakuma Refugee Camp is a refugee camp located in northwestern Turkana County, Kenya. It was established in 1992 to host unaccompanied minors who had fled the war in Sudan and from camps in Ethiopia. The camp is situated in the second poorest region in Kenya and as a result of this poverty, there are ongoing tensions between the refugees and the local community that has occasionally resulted in violence.

== History ==
The camp was established in 1991 to host unaccompanied minors who had fled the war in Sudan and from camps in Ethiopia. It is estimated that there were 12,000 “lost boys and girls” who had fled here via Egypt in 1990/91. Victoria Adhar Arop led children under her care here. In 2014, the population of Kakuma town was 60,000, having grown from around 8,000 in 1990.

== Geography ==
Kakuma Refugee Camp is located in northwestern Turkana County, Kenya. It is situated in the far northwest corner of Kenya, between Lake Turkana, South Sudan, and Uganda.

== Demographics ==
As of December 2020, the site hosts around 200,000 people, mostly refugees from the civil war in South Sudan. Many people in Kakuma are long-term refugees, living in hopelessness and desperation. The situation is particularly bad for young people. Kakuma Camp is divided into four namely: Kakuma 1, 2, 3 and 4 while Kalobeyei Settlement comprises three villages: Village 1, 2 and 3.

== Facilities ==
The complex comprises four parts (Kakuma I-IV) and is managed by the Kenyan government and the Kenyan Department of Refugee Affairs in conjunction with the UNHCR. Staff members are housed outside the camp in three large compounds with various amenities, including a swimming pool, bars, shops, recreational centers, and exercise rooms for weights, yoga, and aerobics.

Riots erupted in July 2025 over cuts in rations and aid.

== Issues ==
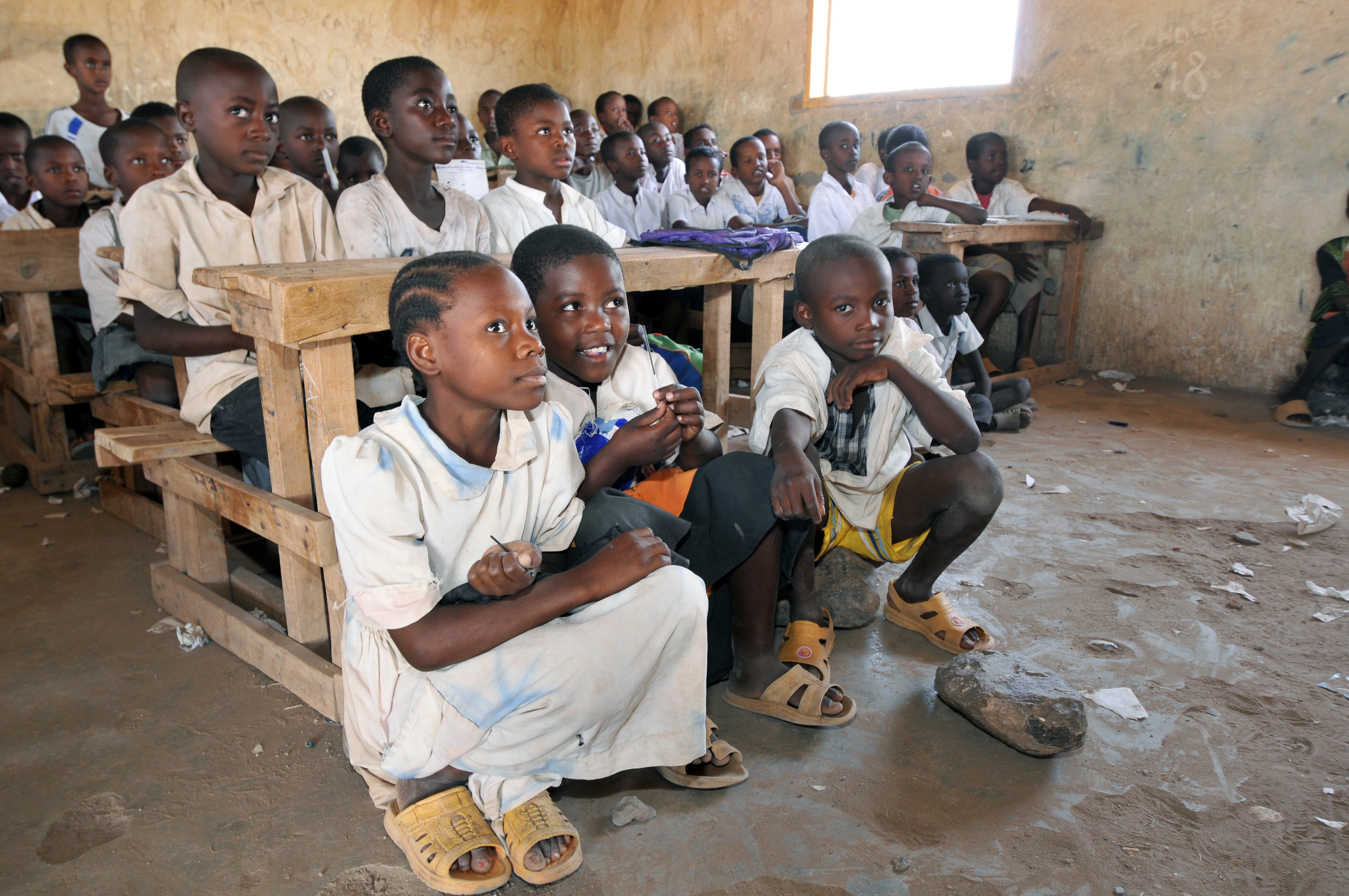
(2011 Education for All Global Monitoring Report) -School children in Kakuma refugee camp, Kenya

Malnutrition, communicable disease outbreaks, and malaria are all ongoing problems, while donor support has faltered due to conflicts in other parts of the world. The only plants that survive are thorny bushes and a few flat-topped trees. As agriculture is almost impossible this results in fierce competition among different local groups for ownership of cattle. Refugees are not allowed to keep animals, due to the potential for conflict between the refugees and the local Turkana people.

== Awards ==
In 2016, Kakuma Refugee Camp became the first recipient of the Ockenden International Prize, an esteemed international prize that recognizes and supports projects that promote the self-reliance of refugees and displaced individuals. The prize, amounting to US$100,000, was awarded to the ‘Women’s Empowerment Project’ by Young African Refugees for Integral Development (YARID) from Kampala, Uganda.
