= List of universities in South Sudan =

This is a list of universities in South Sudan:

== Public universities ==
- John Garang University of Science and Technology, Bor, 2007
- Rumbek University, Rumbek, 2010
- University of Bahr El-Ghazal, Wau, 1991
- University of Juba, 1975
- University of Northern Bahr El-Ghazal, Aweil, 2011
- Upper Nile University, Malakal, 1991
- Akobo Heritage and Memorial University, Akobo, 2016

== Private universities ==
- Brilliant Vision Institute, Juba & Bentiu
- Akobo Health Institute University, Akobo
- African Institute for Health & Social Science, Bentiu, South Sudan Founded in 2014
- Bright National College – Juba, Wau and Bentiu Unity State founded in 2016
- Africa Instep Institute of Science and Technology Founded in 2016 Based in Bentiu
- Bentiu Heritage & Memorial University, planned to be based in Bentiu
- Catholic University of South Sudan, Juba and Wau, 2008
- Mikese University College Yambio South Sudan Founded 2008 Started as internet cafe
- Ebony University, based in Greater Bahr-el-Ghazal, Wau
- South Sudan Christian University Juba, founded in 2010
- WOI University, P.O.BOX 245 Juba, incorporated on 27 May 2011
- St. Mary's University in Juba, Juba, 2009
- Yei Agricultural and Mechanical University, Yei
- Star international university founded in 2016 Affiliate to Bosoga university Uganda) Juba south Sudan
- Starford International University College founded in 2016
- Kuda University, Juba-South Sudan founded in 2016
- Remedial University College, Juba, established 2016
- Ristal University college Juba, founded in 2019, affiliated to Star international university
- Kampala University South Sudan Center founded in 2015
- University of Faith, Center established 2014
- Islamic University of South Sudan established 2012
- Equatoria International University, Eastern Equatoria State- Torit, 2019
- Attasons University College, Eastern Equatoria State-Torit, 2019
- Rain Computer College, Eastern Equatoria State-Torit, 2019
- South University of Medicine, Science and Technology, Juba, Established 2020
- Ayii University, Established in 2020
- Ramciel University Established 2021

Bright international college base in Bentiu and juba south sudan http://ramcieluniversity.edu.ss/

- Hopeland Institute, Juba, established 2019
- Motherland Medical College (MMC) Founded in 2023 based in Juba and Bentiu
- African Zeal University Juba and Lobonok

== See also ==
- Education in South Sudan
- Mikese University College, Yambio

Health Sciences Training Institute by Then in Sudan Affiliated to Medani University and to Juba Health Sciences Institute, Juba South Sudan Founded in 1972 Opposite to Juba Teaching Hospital and is the mother of All Health Institutes in the Republic of South Sudan.
