= Akobo Airport =

- IATA: n/a; ICAO: HSAK

Summary
- Airport type: Public, Civilian
- Owner: Civil Aviation Authority of South Sudan
- Serves: Akobo, South Sudan
- Location: Akobo, South Sudan
- Elevation AMSL: 1,600 ft / 500 m
- Coordinates: 07°47′03″N 033°00′00″E

Map
- Location of Akobo Airport in South Sudan

Runways
Direction	Length		Surface
Direction	ft	m	Surface
17/35	3,600	1,097	Unpaved

Akobo Airport is an airport serving the town of Akobo, in Jonglei State, South Sudan.

== Location ==
Akobo Airport (IATA: n/a, ICAO: HSAK) is located in Akobo County in Jonglei State, in the town of Akobo, near the International border with Ethiopia. The airport is located approximately 4 kilometres (2.5 mi), north of the central business district of Akobo.

This location lies approximately 362 kilometres (225 mi), by air, northeast of Juba International Airport, the largest airport in South Sudan. The geographic coordinates of this airport are: 7° 47' 3.12"N, 33° 0' 0.00"E (Latitude: 7.7842; Longitude: 33.0000). Akobo Airport is situated 500 metres (1,600 ft) above sea level. The airport has a single 1097-meter long unpaved runway.

== Overview ==
Akobo Airport is a small civilian airport that serves the town of Akobo and surrounding communities. There are no known scheduled airlines serving Akobo Airport at this time.

== See also ==
- Akobo
- Jonglei
- List of airports in South Sudan
