= Akobo, South Sudan =

Akobo Akobo Green Town
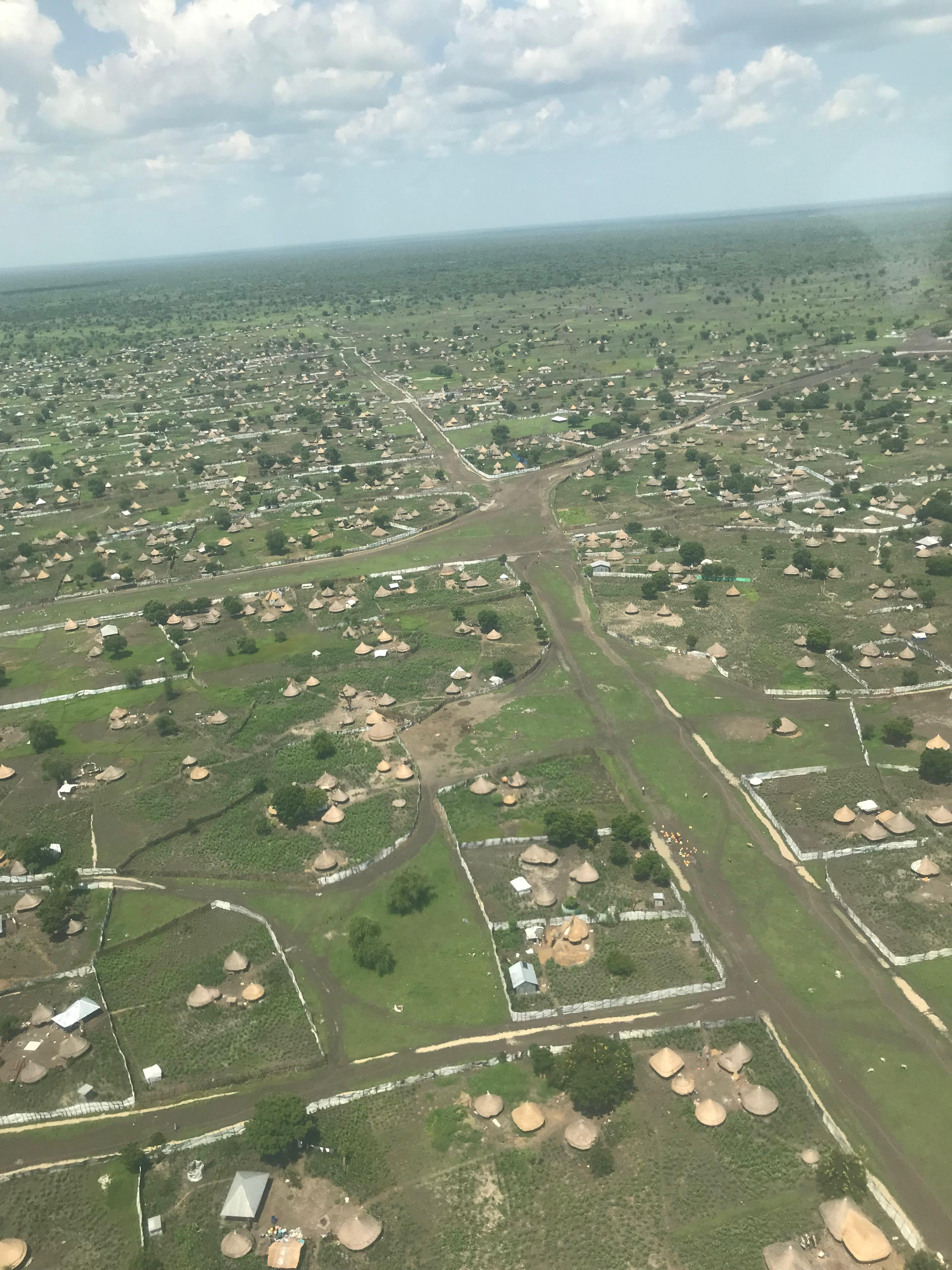
- Akobo viewed from the air

- Location in South Sudan
- Coordinates: 7°47′N 33°3′E
- Country: South Sudan
- Region: Greater Upper Nile
- State: Jonglei State
- County: Akobo County
- Elevation: 1,600 ft (500 m)

Population (2011 Estimate)
  - Total: 1,000
- Time zone: UTC+2 (CAT)
- Climate: Aw

Akobo is a town in eastern South Sudan.

== Location ==
It is located in the Akobo County of Jonglei State in the Greater Upper Nile region of South Sudan, in the northeastern part of South Sudan, near the international border with Ethiopia. Its location lies approximately 450 kilometres (280 mi), by road, northeast of Juba,

== Population ==
According to the Sudanese census, which was boycotted by the South Sudanese government, Akobo County's population was 400,210 in 2008. The land is inhabited by the land natives the Anyuak and Lou Nuer. There are significant levels of malnutrition in Akobo, as elsewhere in Jonglei State. Receipt of malaria treatment supplies, emergency food and emergency health kits to meet the needs of 10,000 people were reported by UNICEF in 2026.

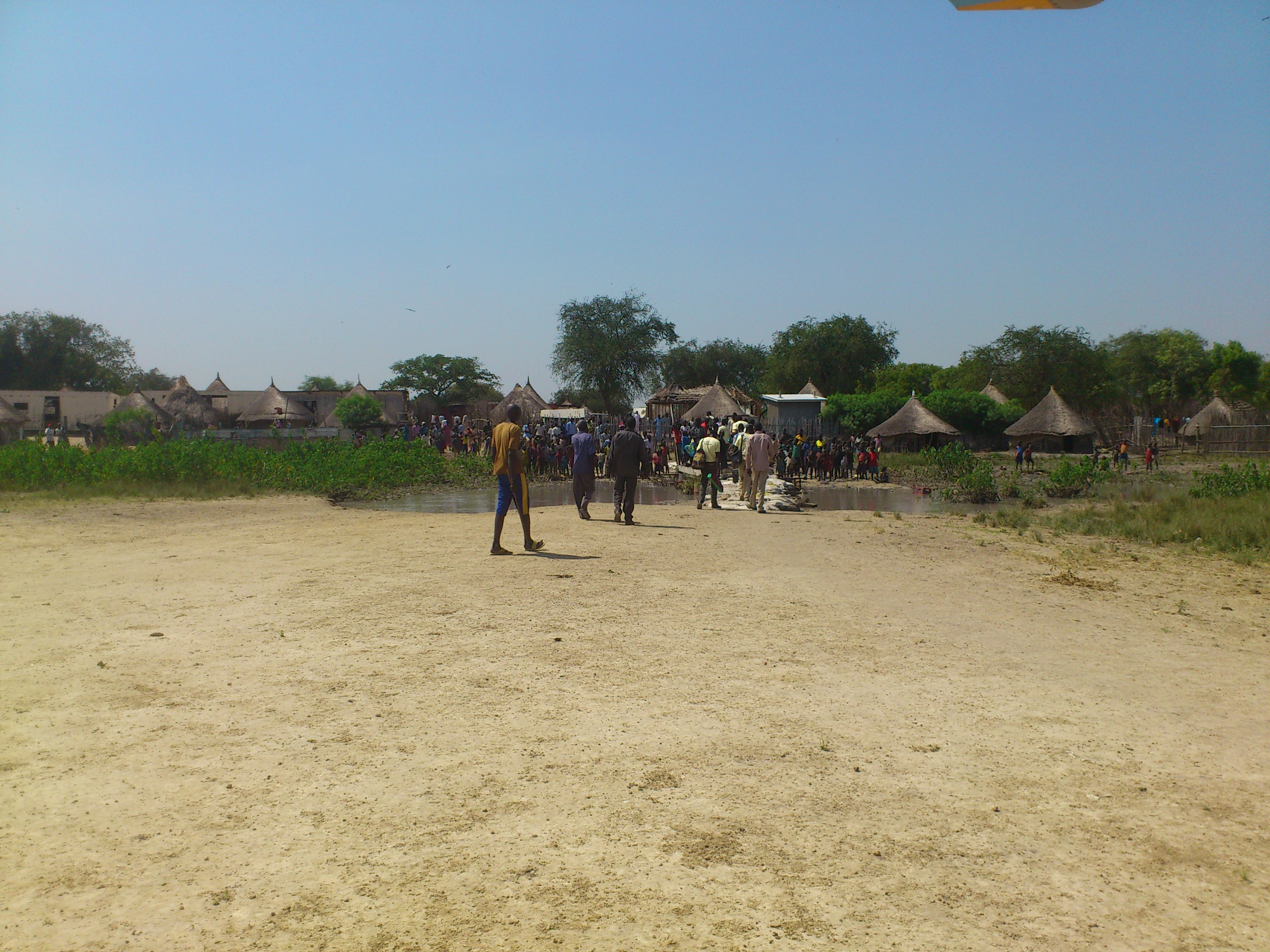
Crossing a stream.

== Transportation ==
From Akobo, one road leads northwest to Padoi and Walgak towards Waat. Another road leads south to Kong Kong and Pibor. The town is also served by Akobo Airport.

== Notable landmarks ==
Notable landmarks in the town of Akobo include the following:

- The offices of Akobo Town Council
- The headquarters of Akobo County Administration
- The town is situated near three rivers: the Geni River to the west, the Pibor River to the east, and the Akobo River to the southeast. The Akobo river empties into the river Pibor at the border town of Old Akobo.
- Akobo has a clinic which was built in 1911 and a hospital which was built between 1976 and 1983. Akobo has three primary schools and one intermediate high school.
- Akobo Heritage and Memorial University - An institution of higher learning
- Akobo Airport - a civilian airport
- Akobo has Akobo Lou Nuer Youth Association office in juba.
- Akobo most part of land are dominated by Cie-both or Cie-dok lineages.

== See also ==
- Akobo County
- Akobo Airport
- Jonglei State
