= Akobo County =

Akobo County Green Town
- County
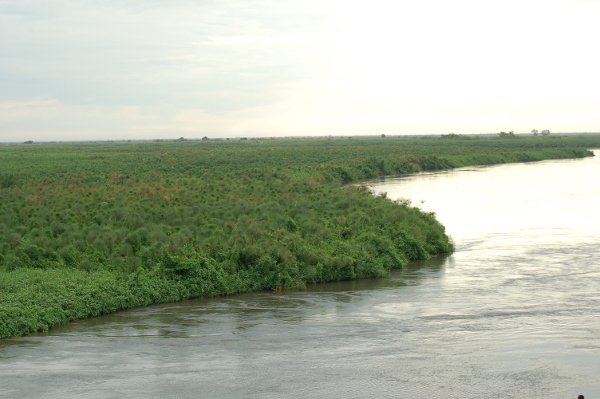

- Location in South Sudan
- Coordinates: 07°56′N 33°00′E
- Country: South Sudan
- Region: Greater Upper Nile
- State: Jonglei State
- Headquarters: Akobo

Population (2008)
  - Total: 136,210
- Time zone: UTC+2 (CAT)

Akobo County is a county in South Sudan.

== Location ==
The county is located in Jonglei State, in the Greater Upper Nile region of South Sudan, bordering the country of Ethiopia. The county headquarter is Akobo, located approximately 450 kilometres (280 mi), northeast of Juba, South Sudan's capital and the largest city in the country.

== Overview ==
The county is one of the eleven counties that constitute Jonglei State. The county is prone to drought and the population is nomadic, sometimes migrating to other locations in search of water and pasture for their livestock. Due to the insecurity associated with military conflict between Sudan and South Sudan, some of the inhabitants of the county have sought refuge in neighboring Ethiopia. Some of those refugees are expected to return following the independence of South Sudan in July 2011.

In 2010, a nutrition survey of young children was carried out by Medair and Save the Children in Southern Sudan (SCiSS). The study found high rates of acute malnutrition and poor child health indicators. These poor indicators included: high percentage of diarrhoea cases among the population, low measles immunity and low levels of vitamin A among the population. The rates of Global Acute Malnutrition were above the World Health Organization (WHO) crisis level but death rates were below WHO emergency levels. The researchers concluded that may be the feeding programme started in 2009 was enough to prevent some deaths, or that the more vulnerable died during the civil strife of 2009.

== Population ==
According to the 2008 South Sudanese census, the population of Akobo County was estimated at 136,210. Of these, 60,896 (44.7%) were female and 75,314 (55.3%) were male.

== See also ==
- Akobo
- Akobo Airport
- Bieh State
