= University of Juba =

University in South Sudan

- جامعة جوبا
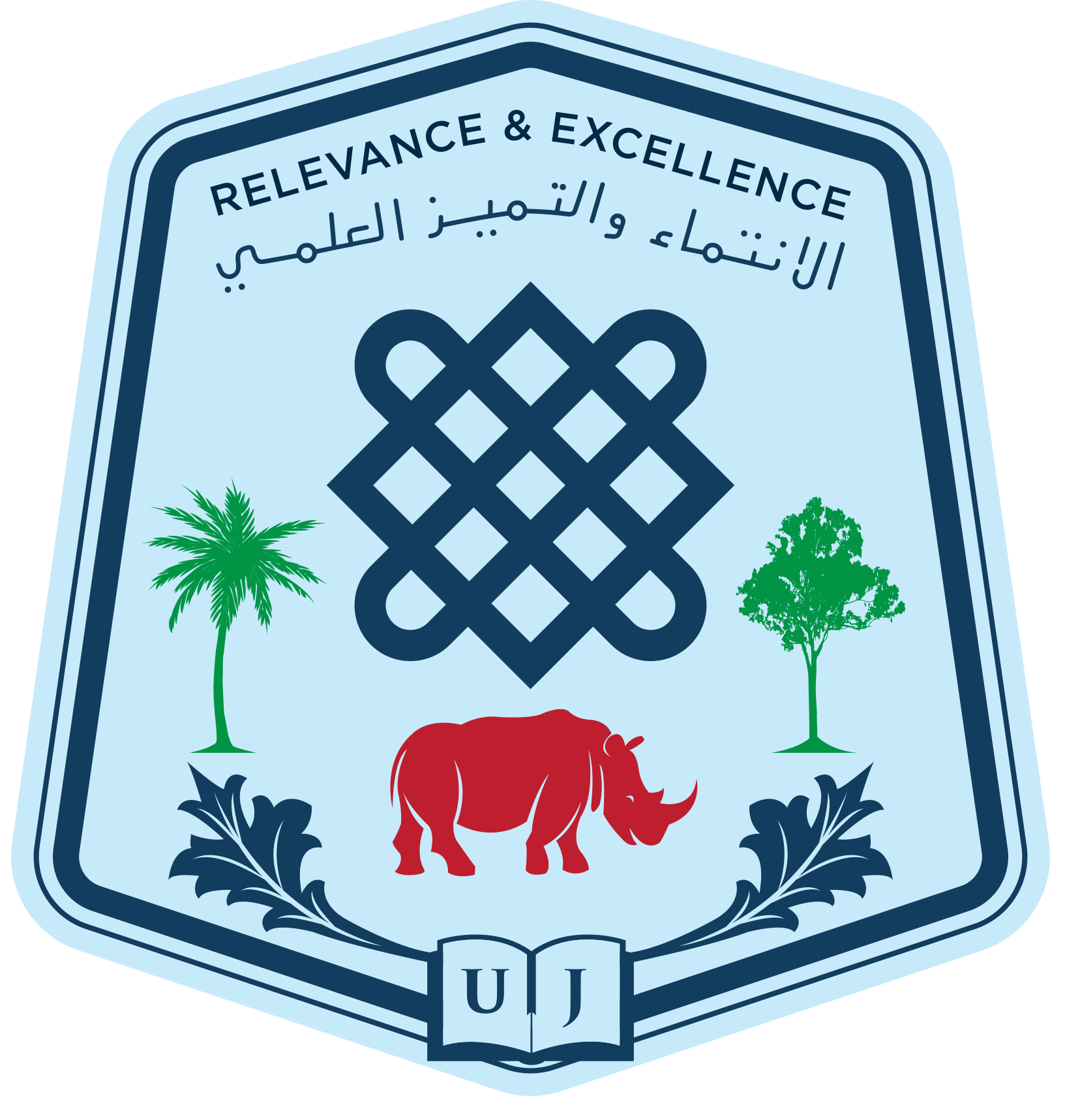
- Motto: Relevance & Excellence
- Type: Public
- Established: 1975; 51 years ago
- Chancellor: Salva Kiir (President of South Sudan)
- Vice-Chancellor: Prof.John Akec Apurot
- Students: c. 40,000
- Postgraduates: c. 5,000
- Location: Juba, South Sudan; 4°50′28″N 31°35′24″E
- Campus: Urban (main campus in downtown Juba)
- Website: uoj.edu.ss

The University of Juba (Arabic: جامعة جوبا) is an English-language public university in Juba, the capital of South Sudan. Established in 1975 as the first institution of higher education in southern Sudan, the university admitted its first students in 1977. It is the largest and highest-ranked university in South Sudan.

The university was founded during Gaafar Nimeiry's presidency, with key involvement from Abel Alier, then Vice President of Sudan and President of the Southern Region's High Executive Council, following the 1972 Addis Ababa Agreement which granted autonomy to Southern Sudan. The institution was established to address the shortage of local tertiary education and to train civil servants for the autonomous administration of the region.

Due to the Second Sudanese Civil War (1983–2005), the university was temporarily relocated to Khartoum for the safety of staff, students, and infrastructure. Following South Sudan's independence on 9 July 2011, the university fully repatriated to Juba.

== Administration ==
The President of South Sudan serves as Chancellor of all public universities in the country. The Vice Chancellor is appointed by presidential decree. On 8 March 2024, President Salva Kiir dismissed Professor John Akec, who had served as Vice Chancellor since 2014, and appointed Professor Robert Mayom Deng (also known as Robert Mayom Kuoirot), the former Deputy Vice Chancellor for Administration and Finance, as the 13th Vice Chancellor.In 2025 again President Kirr reappointed John Akec as the vice chancellor for another term. Professor Mayom formally assumed office on 15 March 2024.

== Notable alumni ==
- Victoria Adhar Arop, member of the National Legislative Assembly and brigadier general

== Academic structure ==
The university has approximately 40,000 students, including over 5,000 postgraduate students, across 23 schools, 3 colleges, 4 institutes, and 7 specialized centres.

=== Schools ===
- School of Applied and Industrial Science
- School of Architecture
- School of Art, Music and Drama
- School of Arts and Humanities
- School of Business and Management
- School of Community Studies and Rural Development
- School of Computer Sciences and Information Technology
- School of Education
- School of Engineering (established 1997)
- School of Journalism, Media and Communication
- School of Law
- School of Mathematics
- School of Medical Laboratory
- School of Medicine
- School of Natural Resources and Environmental Studies
- School of Nursing
- School of Petroleum and Minerals
- School of Pharmacy
- School of Public Health
- School of Public Service
- School of Social and Economic Studies
- School of Tourism and Hospitality Management
- School of Veterinary Medicine

=== Colleges ===
- Graduate College (re-instituted 2016)
- Kuajok Community College
- Open Education College

=== Institutes ===
- Institute of Peace, Development and Security Studies
- National Transformational Leadership Institute
- French Institute
- Mayardit Academy for Space Sciences

=== Specialized centres ===
- Centre for Human Resource Development and Continuing Education
- Centre for Languages and Translation
- Centre for Distance Education
- Centre for Peace and Development
- STEM and Vocational Centre
- Open and Distance Education Learning (ODEL) Centre

== See also ==
- Education in South Sudan
- List of universities in South Sudan
