= Biri River =

- Location within South Sudan

Location
- Country: South Sudan
- State: Western Bahr el Ghazal

Physical characteristics
- Source
  - coordinates: 7.2150°N 25.9925°E
- Mouth: Kuru River
  - coordinates: 7.9631°N 26.4219°E

The Biri River is a river of South Sudan. It is a left tributary of the Kuru River, a headwater of the Lol River.

== Course ==
The Biri River rises in the south of the Western Bahr el Ghazal near the border with Haut-Mbomou in the Central African Republic. It flows in a north-northeast direction past Deim Zubeir (which lies to the east), then northeast to the border with Northern Bahr el Ghazal, where it joins the Chel or Kuru River from the left.

== Historical ==
The first European to visit the river appears to have been Dr. Georg August Schweinfurth, who spent three years exploring the Bahr-el-Ghazal region before returning to Europe in the fall of 1871. He did not take any astronomical observation, so did not record latitude or longitude, but did keep an excellent dead reckoning of distances and direction. His map of the courses of rivers such as the Biri and Kuru are very accurate.

Frank Lupton in his 1884 Geographical Observations in The Bahr-el-Ghazal Region showed the Biri river flowing northeast past Deim Zubeir, but then (incorrectly) shows it being joined by the Sabu (Sopo) River before flowing into the Boru (Boro) River before the Kuru River joined the Boru. In June 1894 a Belgian force under Xavier-Ernest Donckier de Donceel entered the region from the southwest. It crossed the Biri, Sopo and Cohoca (?) rivers and arrived at Liffi south of the Raja River on 25 June 1894.

== Sources ==
- Johnston, Sir Harry (1903), The Nile Quest, Lawrence and Bullen, archived from the original (PDF) on August 2, 2019
- Lupton, Frank (1888), Der Sudan unter ägyptischer Herrschaft: Rückblicke auf die letzten sechzig Jahre by Richard Buchta (map)
- Santandrea, S. Sudan Notes and Records (December 1955), "The Belgians in Western Bahr el Ghazal", Sudan Notes and Records, 36 (2), University of Khartoum: 188–191, JSTOR 41716698
- "Way: Biri (625766815)", OpenStreetMap
