= Liffi =

- Station
- Location within South Sudan
- Coordinates: 8.609°N 25.637°E
- Country: South Sudan
- State: Western Bahr el Ghazal

Liffi (or Lefi) was a military station in Sudan, named after a nearby hill, and the surrounding region. It was the location of several clashes between Egyptian forces and Mahdists in the early 1880s. In 1894 the Belgians temporarily established a base there.

== Mount Liffi ==
The rocky Mount Liffi, or Jabal Liffi, (8.545331°N 25.827294°E) is a short distance to the southeast of Khor Shammam. Mount Liffi is a metamorphic rock cone 150 feet (46 m) high, not far from Kagola.

S. Santandrea, writing in 1948, says that the Togoyo tribe, by then almost extinct, had a legend that their ancestor Cokwol had fallen from heaven on Mount Lefi, which travelers such as Romolo Gessi called Liffi. They had lived there during their golden age and were still living there in the 19th century when the region was devastated by warfare, slave hunting, famine and disease. A few clans still existed, centered around Mount Lefi, where the tribe used to sacrifice a goat on a sacred stone to bring the rains. The Togoyo territory extended from Khor Shammam (Note: Khor Shamman is a village about 8 miles (13 km) east of Raga.) to eastward of Kossinga, and they were fairly numerous until the end of the 19th century. A 1955 article stated that Liffi post had formerly been in Togoyo land but was now in Feroge land.

== Liffi station ==
Romolo Gessi (1831–1881) often mentions Liffi as a large center with government officials, granaries and other facilities. An 1880 account describes Liffi as a large fortified station with a garrison of 25 regular and 150 irregular soldiers. The area around Liffi was very densely populated.

Frank Lupton in his 1884 Geographical Observations in The Bahr-el-Ghazal Region showed Liffi as a station at approximately 8.7°N 25.9°E, between the Lugu and Boru rivers a short distance from the point where they converge, and on the route from Deim Zubeir (Note: Deim Zubeir is shown as "Dem Siber" on a German version of Lupton's map.) to the south to Foroga to the north. On this map the road from Deim Zubeir runs through Sakka just south of the Lugu river, then runs through Liffi between the Lugu and Boru rivers. OpenStreetMap shows Lupton's coordinates for Liffi as a short distance east of the convergence of the Raga and Boro rivers, and shows the road from Deim Zubeir running north and crossing the Raga and Boro rivers to the west of their junction. (Note: It is possible that Lupton's Sakka and Lugu River are today's Raga and Raga River.) Lupton's coordinates may have been inaccurate.

== Colonial period ==
In 1881 Muhammad Rauf Pasha, Gordon's successor at Khartoum, appointed Frank Lupton governor of the Bahr el Ghazal in place of Gessi. Lupton made his base in Bahr el Ghazal at Deim Suliman, now Deim Zubeir. He divided the province of Bahr el Ghazal into eight districts. Liffi District corresponded to the later Raga County. (Note: Lupton's eight districts were Liffi (now Raga District), Bakko (about 20 miles (32 km) west northwest of Deim Zubeir), Dembo (about 8°24′0″N 27°24′0″E), Kawaki (Adlan, 35 miles (56 km) southeast of Deim Zubeir, Biselli (perhaps today's Limbo), Sabi (the area between Jebel Gangua and Jebel Yarra), Jur Kurshukali (the area southwest of Yabulu)) and Jur Ghattas (the present Tonj).)

On 18 August 1882 members of the Dinka tribe under Sheikh Jango rebelled against the Egyptian government at Liffi, the first outbreak of Mahdism in the province. They attacked some of Lupton's bashi-bazouks at Liffi and gained the surrender of the inhabitants. Lupton took 600 men to the scene but Jango had retreated. Lupton advanced from Deim Zubeir around the end of 1882 and defeated Jango in a bloody encounter at Jabal Telgona. Early in 1883 Jango returned with some men provided by the Emir Madibbo. On 1 February 1883 Lupton's chief Ruffai Agha fought off another attack by Sheikh Jango in the Liffi district. Ruffai Agha entrenched his force near Dembo, but was attacked by Mahdists in September and killed with almost all his men. The Dinkas all rebelled and blocked the road to Meshra El Rek and the north. Lupton retreated to Deim Zubeir.

In March 1894 a Belgian force led by Charles de la Kethulle established a post at Katuaka (8°48'N) on the Bahr el Adda which they called Fort de l'Adda. In June 1894 another Belgian force under Xavier-Ernest Donckier de Donceel entered the region from the southwest. It crossed the Biri, Sopo and Cohoca (?) rivers and arrived at Liffi south of the Raja River on 25 June 1894. On 18 July 1894 the Belgians reached the Boro river, and moved on to the home of Faki Ahmed, the son of Sultan Yussef of Wadai. He submitted to the Belgians and was sent to Liffi to talk with Donckier. On 9 September Donckier was at Liffi on the Luju, and raised the Belgian flag on the 400 metres (1,300 ft) Mount Den Darh. The Belgians found themselves short of food, with the local people trying to seize their stores and a threat of attack by Mahdists. While the Belgians were debating what to do, on 9 December 1894 they heard that they were to leave all territory north of the Mbomu River, which had been ceded to the French. Around the end of 1894 and start of 1895 the Belgians left the Bahr el Ghazal region and handed it over to the French.

== Sources ==
- Between: Government of Sudan and Sudan People's Liberation Movement/army – Rejoinder of the Government of Sudan, 28 February 2009
- Gleichen, Lord Edward (1905), The Anglo-Egyptian Sudan: A Compendium Prepared by Officers of the Sudan Government, H. M. Stationery Office
- Lupton, Frank (1888), [[[:File:Karte der ägyptischen Mudirien Bahr-el-Ghasal und Hat-el-Estiva, den Provinzen Lupton-Bey's und Emin-Pascha's.png]] Der Sudan unter ägyptischer Herrschaft: Rückblicke auf die letzten sechzig Jahre by Richard Buchta] (map)
- Macro, E. (1947), "Frank Miller Lupton", Sudan Notes and Records, 28, University of Khartoum: 50–61, JSTOR 41716507
- "Map 10/8.7148/25.8941", OpenStreetMap
- Santandrea, S. (1948), "Little known tribes of the Bahr el Ghazal basin", Sudan Notes and Records, 29 (1), University of Khartoum: 78–106, JSTOR 41716540
- Santandrea (December 1953), "A Preliminary Account of the Indri, Togoyo, Feroge, Mangaya and Woro", Sudan Notes and Records, 34 (2), University of Khartoum: 230–264, JSTOR 41719477
- Santandrea, S.Sudan Notes and Records (December 1955), "The Belgians in Western Bahr el Ghazal", Sudan Notes and Records, 36 (2), University of Khartoum: 188–191, JSTOR 41716698
- Wilson, Charles Thomas; Felkin, Robert William (1883), Uganda und der aegyptische Sudan, Cotta
