= Lol State =

State in South Sudan from 2015 to 2020

- State of South Sudan
- 2015–2020
- The administrative subdivisions of Sudan in 2015, including the Lol State.
- Capital: Raga
- Government
  - Type: State
- Governor
  - 2015–2020: Rezik Zechariah Hassan
- History
  - Established: 2 October 2015
  - Disestablished: 22 February 2020
- Contained within
  - Country: South Sudan
  - Region: Bahr el Ghazal
- Political subdivisions: 11 counties (2015–2016); 14 counties (2016–2020)
Preceded by	Succeeded by
Northern Bahr el Ghazal; Western Bahr el Ghazal	Northern Bahr el Ghazal; Western Bahr el Ghazal

The Lol State was a state of South Sudan with the capital in Raga, that existed between 2 October 2015 and 22 February 2020. It was located in the Bahr el Ghazal region, which is in the northwest section of the country. Lol state bordered Haut-Mbomou and Haute-Kotto in the Central African Republic to the west, South Darfur and East Darfur in Sudan to the north, the disputed region of Kafia Kingi to the northwest, Aweil East State to the northeast, Aweil State to the east, Gbudwe State to the south, and Wau State to the southeast. The state was created alongside 27 other states after a decree issuing the creation of 28 states took place. It was dissolved at the conclusion of the South Sudanese Civil War.

== History ==
On 2 October 2015, President Salva Kiir issued a decree establishing 28 states in place of the 10 constitutionally established states. The decree established the new states largely along ethnic lines. A number of opposition parties and civil society groups challenged the constitutionality of the decree. Kiir later resolved to take it to parliament for approval as a constitutional amendment. In November the South Sudanese parliament empowered President Kiir to create new states. As a result, Lol State was formed from the counties of Raga County in Western Bahr el Ghazal and Aweil North County and Aweil West County in Northern Bahr el Ghazal, encompassing a region consisting of the majority of the Lol River and its western tributaries.

Rezik Zechariah Hassan was appointed as Governor on 24 December 2015.

On 22 February 2020, President Salva Kiir reverted the 28 states back original ten states at the conclusion of the South Sudanese Civil War. Lol State has since been reincorporated back into Western Bahr el Ghazal and Northern Bahr el Ghazal.

== Geography ==
=== Administrative counties ===
After the split up, Lol State broke down even further for a total of 11 counties. Three new additional counties were created later on 6 October 2016 to bring the total of 14. The 14 counties are part of the 180 counties in South Sudan. The 14 counties are consisted of the following:

- Former Raga (Raja) County:
  - Eri; headquarters: Ere
  - Kuru; headquarters: Uyu-Kuku
  - Ringi; headquarters: Boro
- Former Aweil North County:
  - Korok East; headquarters: Maper Dut Thou
  - Korok West; headquarters: Jach
  - Malual Centre; headquarters: Maper Dut Wieu
  - Malual North; headquarters: Gok Machar
  - Ariath; headquarters: Ariath
  - Korok Centre; headquarters: Mayen Ulem
- Former Aweil West County:
  - Gomjuer East; headquarters: Wedwil
  - Gomjuer West; headquarters: Nyamlel
  - Majakbai; headquarters: Majakbai
  - Marialbai; headquarters: Marialbai
  - Gomjuer Centre; headquarters: unknown

=== Towns and cities ===
The capital and largest city of the state of Lol was Raga. Other towns in Lol State included Gossinga and Deim Zubeir.
