= Diocese of Wanyjok =

Anglican diocese in South Sudan

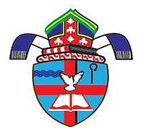
- Logo of the Diocese of Wanyjok
- Scripture: Holy Bible
- Polity: Episcopal Church
- Headquarters: St. Paul Cathedral Panapuoth
- Secondary schools: St. Paul Secondary School
- Official website: https://dow-anglican.org

The Episcopal Diocese of Wanyjok is an Anglican Diocese of the Province of the Episcopal Church of South Sudan. The diocese is centered in Wanyjok, Aweil East County.

The Episcopal Diocese of Wanyjok was made Area Diocese in 2017. Bishop Joseph Mamer Manot was consecrated as bishop suffragan and enthroned as the first bishop of the Episcopal Diocese of Wanyjok on the 28th April 2019

== Archdeaconries ==
- St. Paul's Cathedral
- Wanyjok Archdeaconry
- Malualbaai Archdeaconry
- Yargot Archdeaconry
- Rumkeet Archdeaconry
- Mabok Geng Archdeaconry
- Adoor Archdeaconry
- Makol Archdeaconry
- Mamer Archdeaconry
- Maker Mawien Archdeaconry
- Wunliet Archdeaconry
- Mayom Akot Archdeaconry
- Wunlang Archdeaconry
- Wunyiik Chaplaincy
