= Aroyo, South Sudan =

Areya
- Town
- Location within South Sudan
- Coordinates: 8.6669°N 26.8545°E
- Country: South Sudan
- Region: Bahr el Ghazal
- Region: Northern Bahr el Ghazal
- County: Aweil Center County
- Time zone: UTC+2 (Central Africa Time)

Areya is a town in Northern Bahr el Ghazal, South Sudan.

== Location ==
Aroyo is located on the east bank of the Chel River, to the south of Marial Bai. There was a small airport just north of the town. In January 2012 it was reported that 64 kilometres (40 mi) of road had been completed between Aweil to the east and Aroyo. The project lasted from February to December 2011. In August 2016 some parts of the road from Aweil to Aroyo had been washed away by the rains. Another road led to the B41 to the south. The B41 runs between Wau and Deim Zubeir.

== Recent events ==
On 10 July 2014 a group of soldiers who had deserted laid siege to the compound of the African Kongdai construction company between Aroyo and Awoda. They looted food and medicine from the clinics. The affected communities took refuge near government buildings. The soldiers looted food and other household items from the compound and from villages around Aroyo and Awoda, loading what they had taken into a stolen vehicle. The displaced people, numbering 270 households, made temporary settlements in land provided by the local government in Aroyo centre. Some are unable to return to their homes due to flooding and concerns that other rebel groups were coming and might attack them. They planned to stay until the end of the rainy season in November / December. Concerns included malaria and diarrhoea, lack of staff, food and plastic sheets to cover the temporary grass shelters, and poor latrines.

Aroyo was part of Aweil Center County, but in 2015 became the headquarter of Aroyo County in the new Aweil State. In August 2016 it was reported that the Commissioner of Arroyo County had no vehicle. The 2015 presidential decree that had divided up the states and counties in South Sudan had left many of the local governments without budgets and equipment. Some had no offices or vehicles.

In January 2017 Aroyo County received a shipment of 3-months supply of medicines from the health ministry in Juba. River blindness continued to be a concern, and had not been controlled by the state authorities or health non-governmental organizations.

== Sources ==
- "Arroyo commissioner has no vehicle, left 'begging' for lifts", Radio Tamazuj, 26 August 2016
- "Arroyo County receives medicines from health ministry in Juba", Radio Tamazuj, 26 January 2017
- "Aweil-Aroyo road construction complete", Miraya FM, 17 January 2012
- Inter-agency Assessment Report: Aweil County, Northern Bahr el Ghazal (PDF), IRNA, 11 August 2014
- "Node: Aroyo (1825937139)", OpenStreetMap
