= Awoda =

- Location within South Sudan
- Coordinates: 8.060357°N 26.845391°E
- Country: South Sudan
- Region: Bahr el Ghazal
- State: Northern Bahr el Ghazal
- County: Aweil Center County
- Area codes: for multiple area codes

Awoda is a town in Northern Bahr el Ghazal, South Sudan.

== Location ==
Awoda is located on the road leading south from Aroyo to the B41. The B41 runs between Wau and Deim Zubeir. There is a small airstrip to the southeast of the village. The Awoda Primary Health Care Centre is to the northwest of the village center.

== Health problems ==
A 2001 report from the United Nations Office for the Coordination of Humanitarian Affairs (OCHA) noted that the villagers were suffering from waterborne diseases such as Guinea worm, river blindness and cholera, which could be reduced if the people were given the infrastructure and taught how to build good riverbed wells, and were given water and sanitation education. Other problems included sexually transmitted diseases, leprosy and measles. Ten thousand internally displaced people were living with their kin in Awoda, far more than the residents could support. They needed food, blankets, mosquito nets, shelter, cooking pots and water containers.

== Recent events ==
On 10 July 2014 a group of soldiers who had deserted laid siege to the compound of the African Kongdai construction company between Aroyo and Awoda. They looted food and medicine from the clinics. The affected communities took refuge near government buildings. The soldiers looted food and other household items from the compound and from villages around Aroyo and Awoda, loading what they had taken into a stolen vehicle.

== Sources ==
- Inter-agency Assessment Report: Aweil County, Northern Bahr el Ghazal (PDF), IRNA, 11 August 2014
- "Node: Awoda (4311273781)", OpenStreetMap
- Summary of findings and recommendations from the Mobile Response Team's visit to Awoda near Raga, S W Sudan, OCHA, 18 July 2001 – via Reliefweb
