= Wanyjok =

Wanyjok may refer to:

- Wanyjok FC, a football club
- Wanyjok, South Sudan, a town in the Aweil East county of the Republic of South Sudan
