= Samuel Garang Dut =

South Sudanese politician

Samuel Garang Dut Thiang

State Revenue Authority Northern Bhar El Ghazal
- In office 08 August 2024 – 8, August, 2025
- Governor: Simon Uber Mawut
- Succeeded by: Gok Achuil

Personal details
- Occupation: Politician
- Known for: Activism

Samuel Garang Dut Thiangdit is a South Sudanese politician and activist who has served as the Administrator of finance at State Revenue Authority (SRA) in Northern Bahr el Ghazal State, South Sudan, since 2023. He is a member of the state government under Governor Simon Uber Mawut.

== Biography ==
In December 2020, Dut was arrested in Aweil after publicly criticizing Tong Akeen Ngor for mismanagement of public funds. The civil court convicted him of defamation and detained him for eight months, imposing a SSP 2,000,000. Shortly after his release, military intelligence arrested him in Juba, accusing him of supporting Paul Malong Awan, a rebel-turned-politician and former governor of Northern Bahr el Ghazal. Dut remained detained for nearly ten months until his release on 5 August 2023.

== Career ==
Following his release, Simon Uber Mawut appointed him Deputy Commissioner for State Revenue Authority for Administration and Finance in August 2024. This appointment represents a significant shift from activism to a formal administrative role in state governance . His work involves overseeing rural development policies, promoting cooperative societies, and improving agricultural productivity in the state.

== See also ==
- Northern Bahr el Ghazal State
- Politics of South Sudan
