= Aweil State =

State of South Sudan from 2015 to 2020

- State
- Location of Aweil in South Sudan
- Country: South Sudan
- Capital: Aweil
- Number of Counties: 24
- Number of Municipalities: 1

Population (2014 Estimate)
  - Total: 251,160

Aweil State was a state in South Sudan that existed between 2 October 2015 and 22 February 2020. It was located in the Bahr el Ghazal region and it borders Gogrial to the east, Lol to the west, Aweil East to the north, and Wau to the south. Its capital and largest city was Aweil.

== History ==
The area was originally part of the state of Northern Bahr el Ghazal. On 2 October 2015, President Salva Kiir issued a decree establishing 28 states in place of the 10 constitutionally established states. The decree established the new states largely along ethnic lines. A number of opposition parties and civil society groups challenged the constitutionality of the decree. Kiir later resolved to take it to parliament for approval as a constitutional amendment. In November the South Sudanese parliament empowered President Kiir to create new states.

Ronald Ruai Deng was appointed Governor on 24 December.

On 22 February 2020, a compromise led President Salva Kiir to revert the map of South Sudan to its original ten states. Aweil State is now reincorporated into Northern Bahr el Ghazal.

== Government ==
The current Aweil state was formed on October 2, 2015, and adopted government similar to the South Sudanese Government. The state currently has a stable government. The first governor of Aweil State was Ronald Ruai Deng and was appointed as Governor on 24 December 2015.

== Geography ==
=== Administrative divisions ===
After the split up, Aweil State broke down even further for a total of 8 counties, which were created in April 2016. The 8 counties were consisted of the following:

- Former Aweil Center County:
  - Aroyo; headquarters: Aroyo
  - Bar-mayen; headquarters: Pongo
- Former Aweil South County:
  - Ajak; headquarters: Malek-Alel
  - Ajuet; headquarters: Rum-Tiit
  - Buoncuai; headquarters: Akoc
  - Chimel; headquarters: Udhum
  - Kongder; headquarters: Gakrol
  - Mayom Wel; headquarters: Mayom Wel

Alongside to the creation of the 8 counties, Aweil State also contained the municipality of Aweil.
