= Marial Bai =

- Location in South Sudan
- Country: South Sudan
- Region: Bahr el Ghazal
- State: Northern Bahr el Ghazal
- County: Aweil West County
- Time zone: UTC+2 (CAT)

Marial Bai is a village in Northern Bahr el Ghazal state, South Sudan.

Marial Bai lies between the Magadhik River and Chel or Kuru River, which converge to form the Lol River. It is the real-life hometown of Valentino Achak Deng, the protagonist of the Dave Eggers book, What is the What. Devastated during Sudan's second civil war, Marial Bai now benefits from the efforts of the Valentino Achak Deng Foundation, which has constructed a new Marial Bai Secondary School.
