= Mangar Lual =

- boma village
- Country: South Sudan
- Region: Bahr el Ghazal
- State: Northern Bahr el Ghazal
- County: Aweil South County
- Payam: Tiar-aleit

Mangar Lual is a boma in Tiar-aleit Payam, in the Aweil South County of Northern Bahr el Ghazal state, in the Bahr el Ghazal region of South Sudan.

== Demographics ==
According to the Fifth Population and Housing Census of Sudan, conducted in April 2008, Mangar Lual boma had a population of 4,395 people, composed of 1,890 male and 2,505 female residents. (Note: In 2008, at the time of the census, Mangar Lual was located in Northern Bahr el Ghazal State, Aweil South County. The data collected during the Fifth Population and Housing Census of Sudan were to be the primary source of information for decisions about the number and demarcation of electoral constituencies and administrative boundaries in what was then southern Sudan. South Sudanese officials rejected census results for southern Sudan. See Darfur Relief and Documentation Centre (2010). 5th Population and Housing Census in Sudan – An Incomplete Exercise (PDF) (Report). Darfur Relief and Documentation Centre, Geneva (Switzerland). Archived from the original (PDF) on 18 September 2017. Also, see Demographics of South Sudan.)
