= Boro River =

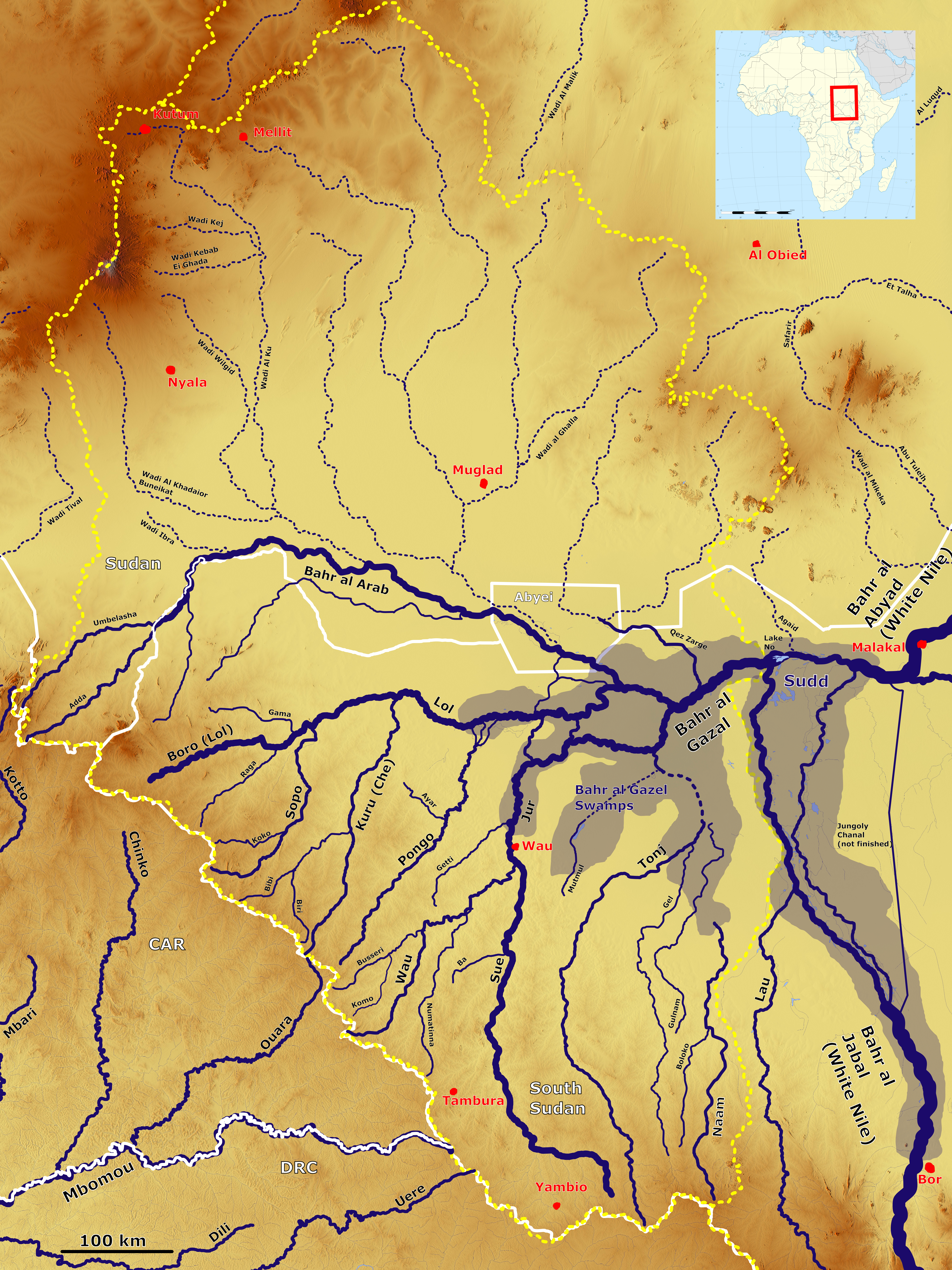

- Location within South Sudan

Location
- Country: South Sudan
- State: Western Bahr el Ghazal

Physical characteristics
- Mouth: Magadhik River
  - coordinates: 8.855176°N 26.194742°E

Basin features
- Tributaries
  - right: Raga River, Sopo River

The Boro River is a river of South Sudan, a headwater of the Magadhik River, which in turn is a headwater of the Lol River.

== Course ==
The Boro River rises in Western Bahr el Ghazal near the border with Haute-Kotto in the Central African Republic and flows in an easterly direction. It is joined from the right by the Raja River to the northeast of the town of Raga. At its confluence with the Sopo River on the border with Northern Bahr el Ghazal the combined streams form the Magadhik River, which flows east to its junction with the Chel River near Nyamlell to form the Lol River, a tributary of the Kiir or Bahr al-Arab.

== Sources ==
- "Way: Boro (773135401)", OpenStreetMap
- "Western Bahr el Ghazal State Map (as of Dec 2016)" (PDF), ReliefWeb, OCHA
