= Tiar-aleit (boma) =

- boma village
- Location within South Sudan
- Coordinates: 8°46′28.1″N 27°53′03.2″E
- Country: South Sudan
- Region: Bahr el Ghazal
- State: Northern Bahr el Ghazal
- County: Aweil South County
- Payam: Tiar-aleit

Tiar-aleit is a boma in Tiar-aleit payam, Aweil South County, Northern Bahr el Ghazal State, in the Bahr el Ghazal region of South Sudan. It is the largest and the headquarters of the Boncuai Community. It is also the educational and business center to the community

== Demographics ==
According to the Fifth Population and Housing Census of Sudan, conducted in April 2008, Tiar-aleit boma had a population of 6,288 people, composed of 2,857 male and 3,431 female residents. (Note: In 2008, at the time of the census, Tiar-aleit was located in Northern Bahr el Ghazal State, Aweil South County. The data collected during the Fifth Population and Housing Census of Sudan were to be the primary source of information for decisions about the number and demarcation of electoral constituencies and administrative boundaries in what was then southern Sudan. South Sudanese officials rejected census results for southern Sudan. See Darfur Relief and Documentation Centre (2010). 5th Population and Housing Census in Sudan – An Incomplete Exercise (PDF) (Report). Darfur Relief and Documentation Centre, Geneva (Switzerland). Also, see Demographics of South Sudan.)
