= Deng Deng Akuei =

South Sudanese politician

Deng Deng Akuei (Deng Manyuom) has been the Governor of Aweil East State, South Sudan since 24 December 2015. He is the first governor of the state, which was created by President Salva Kiir on 2 October 2015.

He previously served as the deputy governor and minister of law enforcement of the Northern Bahr el Ghazal state.
