= Rumaker =

- Village
- Country: South Sudan
- State: Northern Bahr el Ghazal
- Time zone: UTC+2 (CAT)

Rumaker is a village in Northern Bahr el Ghazal, South Sudan.
