= Majak baai =

Village in South Sudan

- Area
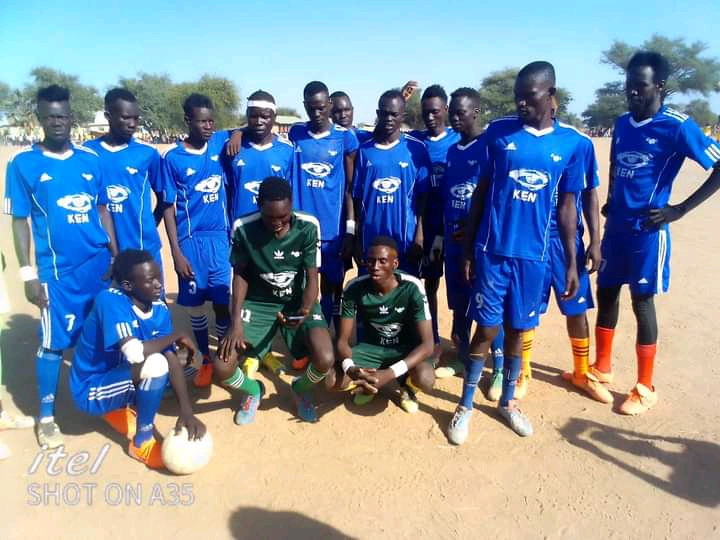
- Football players from Majak Baai

- Location in South Sudan
- Coordinates: 9°9′13.72″N 26°49′50.38″E
- Country: South Sudan
- Region: Bahr el Ghazal
- State: Northern Bahr el Ghazal
- County: Aweil North County
- Elevation: 1,470 ft (448 m)
- Time zone: UTC+2 (CAT)

Majak Bai is an area in Northern Bahr el Ghazal, South Sudan. It is situated close to the area of Agwat and the locality of Nyang.
