= Malualbaai Payam =

Administrative payam in South Sudan

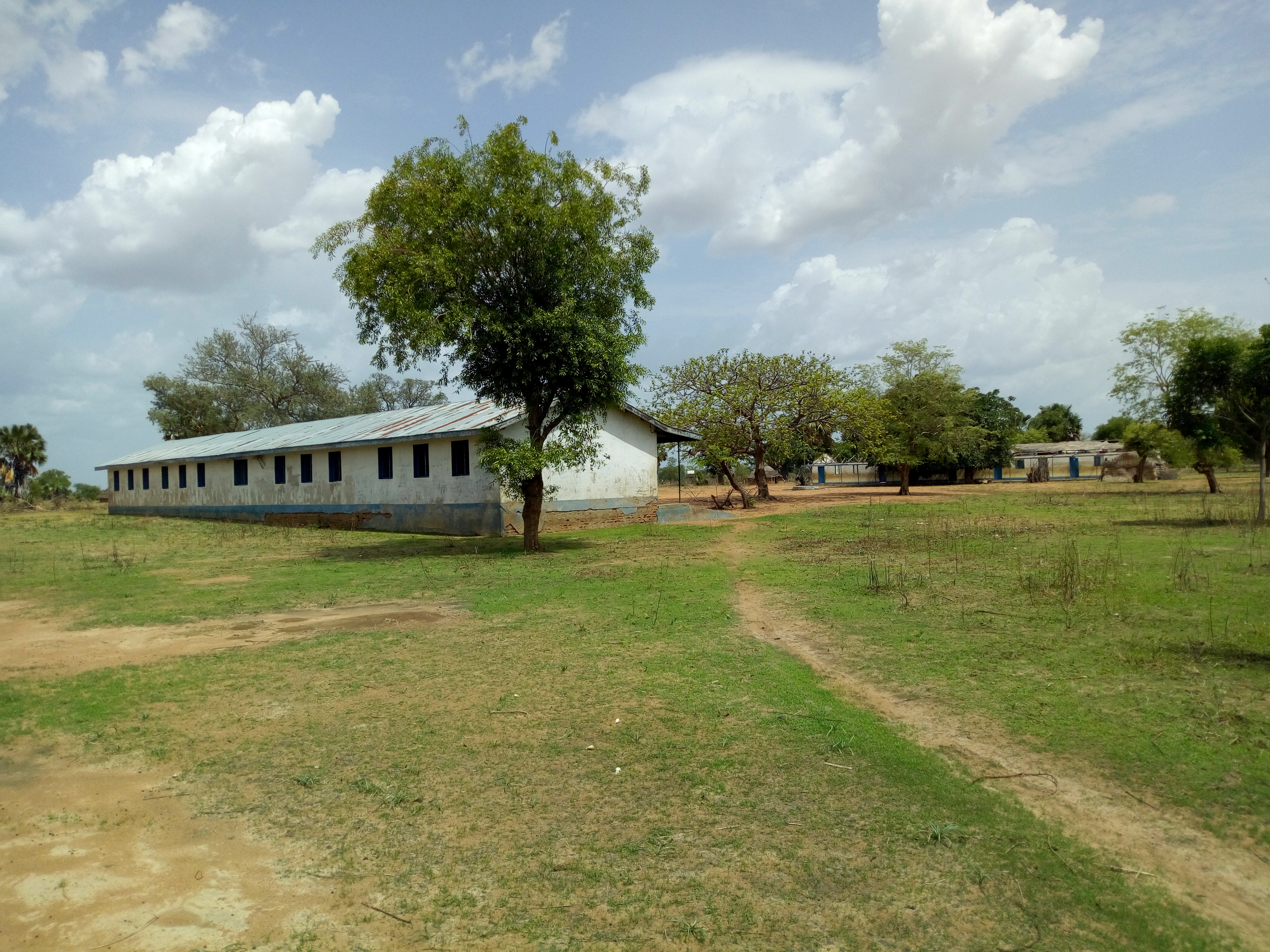
Denyic Primary School

Malualbaai Payam is one of the administrative payam of Aweil East County of South Sudan. It is located at the Eastern part of Wanyjok town.

== Education ==
=== Secondary School ===
1. Aguer Geng Secondary School

=== Primary School ===
1. Denyic Primary School
2. Malualbaai Comboni Primary School
3. Mabil Geng Primary School
4. Majak Paluiel Primary School
5. Peth Primary School
6. Wunkuel Primary School
7. Arieu Primary School
8. Ajeriak Primary School
9. Makuei Dong Primary School
