= Wanyjok FC =

- Full name: Wanyjok Football Club
- Nickname(s): The Lions
- Founded: 8 February 2010; 15 years ago
- Ground: Lions Stadium
- Capacity: 1,200
- President: Joseph Tong
- Head Coach: Ngor Garang
- League: South Sudan Premier League
- 2015–16: 2nd place
- Website: http://www.wanyjokfc.com
Home colours	Away colours

Wanyjok Football Club is a South Sudanese sports club homed in Wanyjok. The team was founded on 8 February 2010 by Wanyjok youths. The team is nicknamed The Lions. Their home ground is Lions Ground.

== Club history ==
Wanyjok F.C. thrashed Mabil F.C. 2–1 in South Sudan Cup qualification. The match was watched by thousands including other officials and deputy governor of Aweil East. Attacker Majok Kuot scored the first goal for Wanyjok FC in the 37th minute which calmed the crowd with cheers and joys. At the other hand, the opponents responded within 10 minutes when Ngor Arol Maker equalized for Mabil F.C. in the 47th minute of the game. As Mabil FC fans were chanting songs for celebrations hoping to go for a penalty kick as they were confident of their goalkeeper, it did not take long when their expectations were shattered after Teng Majok Diing scored yet another goal for Wanyjok football club. Teng who is also nicknamed as Nito picked an out numbered assist from his teammate Majok Kuot when he saw him standing unmarked. Wanyjok F.C. lost to Wau Salaam in South Sudan Cup which was hosted in Aweil.
