= Mabil =

Mabil may refer to:

- Awer Mabil (born 1995), Australian footballer
- Mabil FC, South Sudanese football club
