= Tiar-aleit (payam) =

Tiar-Aliet Tiar
- Payam, Town (administrative division)
- Nickname: Pan Alietdit
- Country: South Sudan
- Region: Bahr el Ghazal
- State: Northern Bahr el Ghazal
- County: Aweil South County

Tiar Aliet is a payam in the Aweil South County of Northern Bahr el Ghazal state, in the Bahr el Ghazal region of South Sudan. It's the first most populous town in Boncuai Community followed by Panthou

== Demographics ==
Tiar-aleit is composed of two bomas: Mangar Lual and Tiar-aleit. According to the Fifth Population and Housing Census of Sudan, conducted in April 2008, Tiar-aleit had a combined population of 10,683 people, composed of 4,747 male and 5,936 female residents. (Note: At the time of the census, Tiar-aleit was located in Northern Bahr el Ghazal, Aweil South County. The data collected during the Fifth Population and Housing Census of Sudan were to be the primary source of information for decisions about the number and demarcation of electoral constituencies and administrative boundaries in what was then southern Sudan. South Sudanese officials rejected census results for southern Sudan. See Darfur Relief and Documentation Centre (2010). 5th Population and Housing Census in Sudan – An Incomplete Exercise (PDF) (Report). Darfur Relief and Documentation Centre, Geneva (Switzerland).. Also, see Demographics of South Sudan.)
