= Mabil FC =

- Full name: Mabil Football Club
- Nickname(s): The Kangaroos
- Founded: 18 September 2011; 13 years ago
- Ground: Mabil Stadium
- Capacity: 1,100
- President: Avraham Mayien
- Head Coach: Jeremaih Mayen
- League: South Sudan Premier League
- 2015–16: 22nd place
- Website: http://www.mabilfc.com
Home colours	Away colours

Mabil Football Club is a South Sudanese sporting club based at Mabil block in Wanyjok, South Sudan. The team was founded on 18 September 2011. The team is nicknamed The Kangaroos. Their home ground is Mabil.

== Club history ==
Mabil faced qualification against Wanyjok F.C. for South Sudan Cup, however, they were knocked out by Wanyjok with a result of 2–1, striker Majok Kuot scored the first goal for Wanyjok FC in the 37th minute. Their opponents equalised within 10 minutes when Ngor Arol Maker equalized for Mabil FC in the 47th minute of the game. On the other hand, Mabil FC fans were chanting songs for celebrations hoping to go for a penalty kick as they were confident of their goalkeeper, it did not take long when their expectations were shattered after Teng Majok Diing scored yet another goal for Wanyjok F.C. Teng who is also nicknamed as Nito picked an outnumbered assist from his teammate Majok Kuot when he saw him standing unmarked. The match was spectated by thousands including deputy governor and other officials of Aweil East.
