= Magadhik River =

- Location within South Sudan

Location
- Country: South Sudan
- State: Northern Bahr el Ghazal

Physical characteristics
- Source
  - coordinates: 8.8555°N 26.1960°E
- Mouth: Lol River
  - coordinates: 9.1097°N 26.9308°E

Basin features
- Tributaries
  - right: Boro River, Sopo River

The Magadhik River is a river of South Sudan, a left tributary of the Lol River.

== Course ==
The Magadhik River forms on the border between Western Bahr el Ghazal and Northern Bahr el Ghazal where the Boro River joins the Sopo River. It flows east to its confluence with the Chel or Kuru River, which joins it from the south to the east of Marial Baai. The combined streams form the Loll or Lol River.

The river runs close to the border with Sudan, to the north. As of May 2013 Médecins Sans Frontières - Spain was the only non-governmental organization based north of the Magadhik River.

== Sources ==
- Meeting Minutes, Aweil, South Sudan, 20 May 2013, Logistics Cluster
- "Way: Boro (773135401)", OpenStreetMap
- "Western Bahr el Ghazal State Map (as of Dec 2016)" (PDF), ReliefWeb, OCHA
