= Tong Akeen Ngor =

South Sudanese politician

Minister of Health (NBGS)
- In office 30 September 2018 – 24 May 2019
- Preceded by: Bol Bak Thou
- Succeeded by: Dr. Aleu Pioth

Governor of Northern Bahr el Ghazal
- In office 19 June 2020 – 8 July 2023
- Preceded by: Jal Malith Jal
- Succeeded by: Simon Uber Mawut

Personal details
- Born: Early 1965 Aweil, Bahr el Ghazal
- Party: SPLM
- Occupation: politician
- Nickname: Bany Koc

Tong Akeen Ngor is a South Sudanese politician who previously served as governor of the state of Northern Bahr el Ghazal. He was appointed by President Kiir in February 2020 as one of revitalized-peace agreement's governors. and was later replaced by Simon Uber Mawut.

== Activist imprisonment ==
A court in Aweil sentenced an activist, Samuel Garang Dut, to eight months in prison for making false statements against Northern Bahr el Ghazal State governor.

Garang Mangok, the presiding judge, found Samuel Garang Dut guilty of libel and slander.

He was also ordered to pay a fine of two million South Sudanese Pounds to Tong Aken.

Garang was ordered to court by Governor Tong after the activist took pictures of a modern building constructed in Juba and claimed it belonged to Governor Aken.
