= Ronald Ruai Deng =

Governor of Aweil State, South Sudan

Ronald Ruai Deng has been the Governor of Aweil State, South Sudan since 24 December 2015. He is the first governor of the state, which was created by President Salva Kiir on 2 October 2015.
