= Nymlal =

- Location in South Sudan
- Coordinates: 9°8′N 26°58′E
- Country: South Sudan
- Region: Bahr el Ghazal
- State: Northern Bahr el Ghazal
- County: Aweil West County
- Time zone: UTC+2 (CAT)

Nymlal (also spelled Nyamlell) is the headquarter of Aweil West County and one the populated places in the Northern Bahr el Ghazal state in South Sudan, north-west of the town of Aweil on the banks of the Lol River.

Nymlal, situated in Aweil West County, has a marketplace. Most of the people in and around Nymlal are Dinka. The name Nymlal has the meaning of "the place where stones are eaten".

According to Francis Bok and human rights organizations, Nymlal was raided several times by an "Arab militia" from northern Sudan during the Second Sudanese Civil War.
