= What Is the What =

2006 novel written by Dave Eggers

What Is the What: The Autobiography of Valentino Achak Deng
- First edition cover
- Author: Dave Eggers
- Cover artist: Rachell Sumpter
- Language: English
- Genre: Fiction, memoir
- Publisher: McSweeney's
- Publication date: October 25, 2006
- Publication place: United States
- Media type: Print (hardcover)
- Pages: 475 pp
- ISBN: 1-932416-64-1
- OCLC: 75428313
- Dewey Decimal: 813/.6 22
- LC Class: PS3605.G48 W43 2006

What Is the What: The Autobiography of Valentino Achak Deng is a 2006 novel written by Dave Eggers. It is based on the life of Valentino Achak Deng, a Sudanese child refugee who immigrated to the United States under the Lost Boys of Sudan program. It was a finalist for the National Book Award.

== Plot summary ==
Achak is separated from his family during the Second Sudanese Civil War when the Arab militia, referred to as murahaleen (which is Arabic for the deported), wipes out his Dinka village, Marial Bai. During the assault, he loses sight of his father and his childhood friends, Moses and William K. William K escapes. However, Moses is believed to be dead after the assault. Achak seeks shelter in his aunt's house with his mother, who is frequently identified throughout the book with a yellow dress. Before they are hidden, they hear the screaming of Achak's aunt, and his mother goes to investigate. Achak never sees her again. He evades detection by hiding in a bag of grain and credits God for helping him stay quiet.

He flees on foot with a group of other young boys (the "Lost Boys"), encountering great danger and terrible hardship along the way to Pinyudo, a refugee camp in Ethiopia. Their inflated expectations of safety and relief are shattered by the conditions at the camp. After Ethiopian president Mengistu is overthrown and soldiers open fire on them, they flee to another refugee camp in Kakuma, Kenya.

The book consists of three parts: part 1 covers Achak's experiences in Sudan before he became a refugee aged 6 in 1983, part 2 is about his years in the camp in Ethiopia, and part 3 covers his life during more than a decade in Kakuma, Kenya. There is a framework story of Achak living in Atlanta in 2005, where he was assaulted, robbed, and injured in his apartment. As he is going through that experience, he tells his story to Michael, the 10-year-old assigned to guard him by his assailants (part 1), to Julian, the reception nurse in the Emergency Room where he waits for treatment for 14 hours (part 2) and several members of the gym where he works the reception (part 3). The framework story allows him to tell about his experiences after arriving in the US and about his recent personal tragedy. Part 3 ends just before he departs from Kenya but does not describe his travels or the start of his American experience. The current story set in Atlanta also allows Achak, as the narrator, and Dave Eggers, as the novelist, to end the book on a high, inspiring note because the assault experience motivates Achak to pull himself together and reach for higher goals.

== Reception ==
In the novel's preface, Deng writes: "Over the course of many years, Dave and I have collaborated to tell my story... I told [him] what I knew and what I could remember, and from that material, he created this work of art."

The book is typical of Eggers' style: blending non-fictional and fictional elements into a non-fiction novel or memoir. By classifying the book a novel, Eggers says, he freed himself to re-create conversations, streamline complex relationships, add relevant detail and manipulate time and space in helpful ways—all while maintaining the essential truthfulness of the storytelling.

However, not all critics were impressed. Lee Siegel sees as much of Dave Eggers in the novel as Deng, unable to tell the two apart, saying "How strange for one man to think that he could write the story of another man, a real living man who is perfectly capable of telling his story himself—and then call it an autobiography."

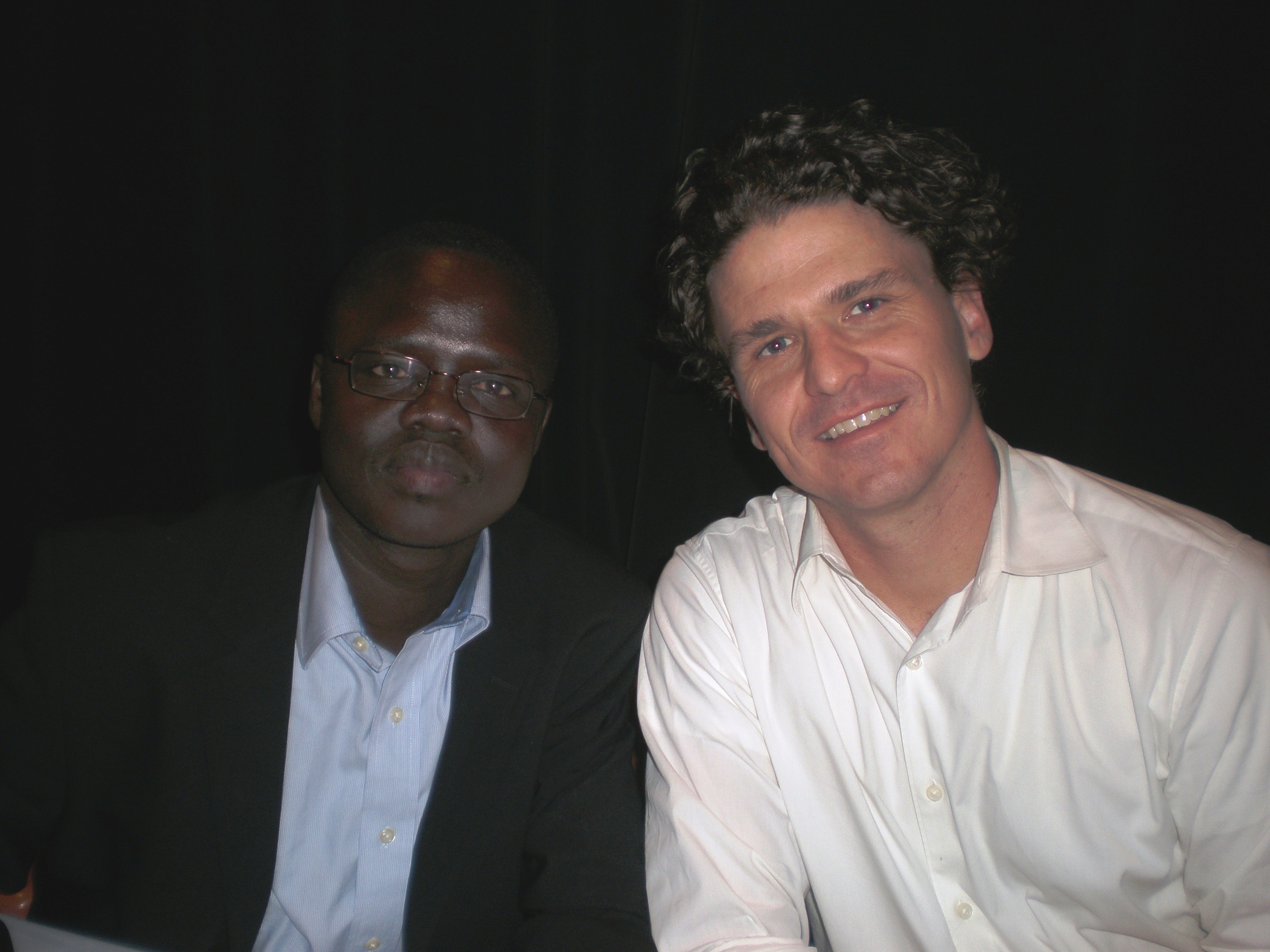
Deng and Eggers in October 2008

Questions of "expropriation of another man's identity" were addressed by Valentino Achak Deng and Dave Eggers in a discussion about the division between the speaker and the spoken for. After Eggers was approached with the idea, he began to prepare for the novel. He says that at this point, "we really hadn’t decided whether I was just helping Valentino write his own book, or if I was writing a book about him." Valentino points out that, "I thought I might want to write my own book, but I learned that I was not ready to do this. I was still taking classes in basic writing at Georgia Perimeter College."

Dave Eggers discusses the difficulties in writing a book of this nature:

"For a long while there, we continued doing interviews, and I gathered the material. But all along, I really didn’t know exactly what form it would finally take—whether it would be first person or third, whether it would be fiction or nonfiction. After about eighteen months of struggle with it, we settled on a fictionalized autobiography, in Valentino’s voice." Eggers explains that this choice was made because "Valentino’s voice is so distinct and unforgettable that any other authorial voice would pale by comparison. Very early on, when the book was in a more straightforward authorial voice, I missed the voice I was hearing on the tapes. So writing in Val's voice solved both problems: I could disappear completely, and the reader would have the benefit of his very distinct voice."

In 2007 Ohio State University selected the novel as one of two choices for the freshmen book club and distributed thousands of copies to incoming students. Duke University required the incoming class of 2012 to read the novel and praised its literary merit. The University of Maryland chose it as their freshman book in 2009. Macalester College required all incoming freshmen to read it in 2011. The University of Maine required first-year students in its Honors College to read the novel in 2012.

The novel inspired some of the lyrics from David Byrne and Brian Eno's album Everything That Happens Will Happen Today.

== Awards ==
- Salon Book Award (2006)
- National Book Critics Circle Award (Fiction) finalist (2007)
- International Dublin Literary Award longlist (2008)
- Prix Médicis award (2009)

== See also ==
- Mary Williams (activist)
