= Rezik Zechariah Hassan =

South Sudanese politician

Rezik Zechariah Hassan has been the Governor of Lol State, South Sudan since 24 December 2015. He is the first governor of the state, which was created by President Salva Kiir on 2 October 2015.

He was previously Governor of Western Bahr el Ghazal.
