= Raga Airport =

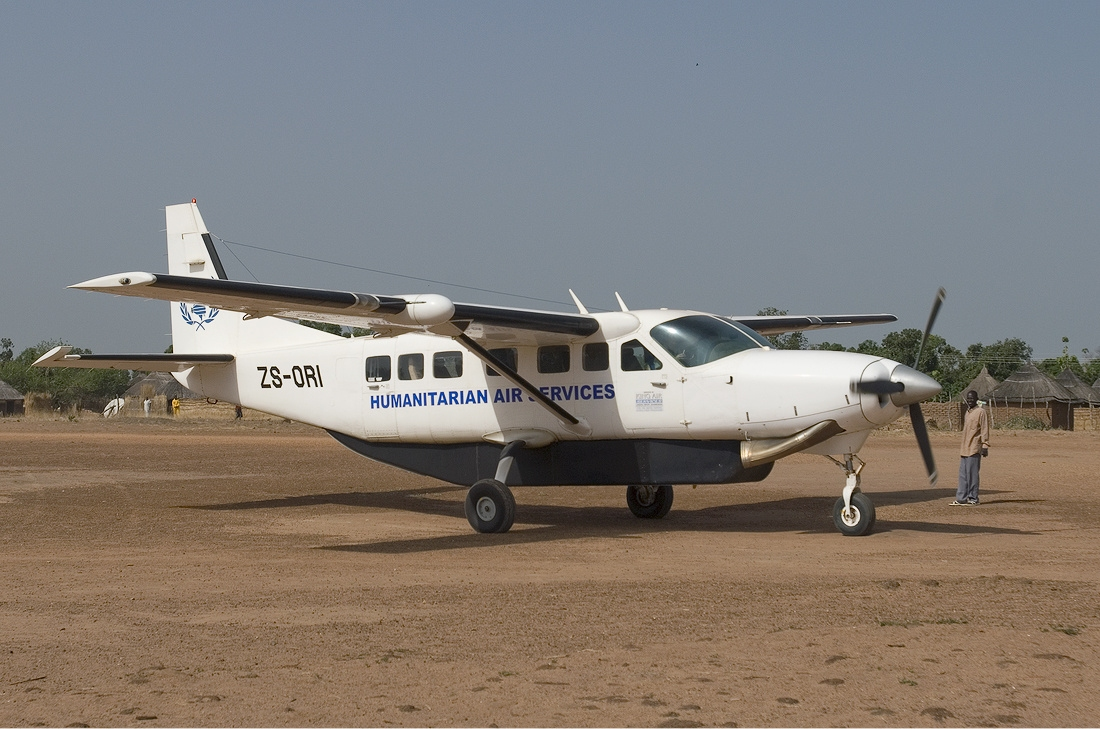
- A Cessna 208 of the United Nations Humanitarian Air Service at the airport in 2007
- IATA: None; ICAO: HSRJ

Summary
- Airport type: Public, Civilian
- Owner: Civil Aviation Authority of South Sudan
- Serves: Raga, South Sudan
- Location: Raga, South Sudan
- Elevation AMSL: 1,788 ft / 545 m
- Coordinates: 08°27′54″N 25°40′48″E

Map
- Location of Raga Airport in South Sudan

Runways
Direction	Length		Surface
Direction	ft	m	Surface
			Unpaved

Raga Airport is an airport serving the town of Raga in South Sudan.

== Location ==
Raga Airport is located in the town of Raga in Western Bahr el Ghazal near the international borders with the Central African Republic and the Republic of Sudan. The airport is located southwest of the central business district of the town.

This location lies approximately 770 kilometres (480 mi), by air, northwest of Juba International Airport, the largest airport in South Sudan.

The geographic coordinates of this airport are: 8° 27' 54.00"N, 25° 40' 48.00"E (Latitude: 8.4650; Longitude: 25.6800). Raga Airport is situated 545 metres (1,788 ft) above sea level. The airport has a single unpaved runway, the dimensions of which are not publicly known at this time.

== Services ==
Raga Airport is a small civilian airport that serves the town of Raga and surrounding communities. There are no known scheduled airlines serving Raga Airport at this time.

== See also ==
- Raga, South Sudan
- Western Bahr el Ghazal
- List of airports in South Sudan
