= Sopo River =

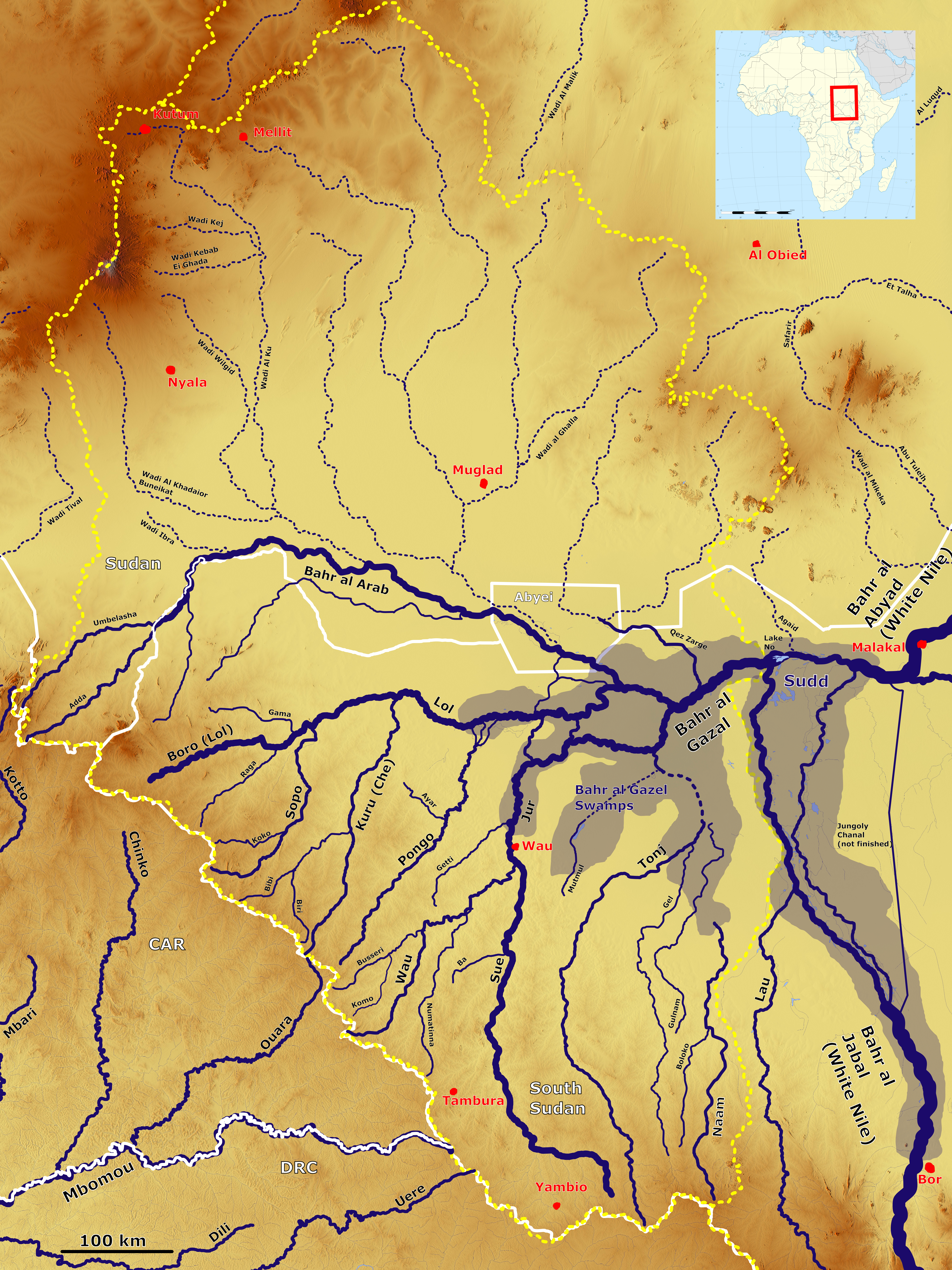

- Location within South Sudan

Location
- Country: South Sudan
- State: Western Bahr el Ghazal

Physical characteristics
- Mouth: Lol River
  - coordinates: 8.855079°N 26.195713°E

The Sopo River is a river in South Sudan's state of Western Bahr el Ghazal.

== Course ==
The Sopo river rises on the border with the Central African Republic, and flows in a generally northeast direction past the town of Sopo. to join the Boro River on the border with Northern Bahr el Ghazal. The combined stream is the Magadhik River, which in turn joins the Chel River to form the Lol River, a tributary of the Bahr al-Arab.

== See also ==
- List of rivers of South Sudan
