= Kuru River =

- Location within South Sudan

Location
- Country: South Sudan
- State: Western Bahr el Ghazal; Northern Bahr el Ghazal

Physical characteristics
- Source
  - coordinates: 6.9942°N 26.2116°E
- Mouth: Lol River
  - coordinates: 9.1097°N 26.9308°E

Basin features
- Tributaries
  - left: Biri River

The Kuru River, or Chel River (Note: The United Nations Office for the Coordination of Humanitarian Affairs (OCHA) map as of December 2016 names the river "Kuru" in its upper (southern) reaches, then "Chel" for most of its length. A topographic map prepared by the Centre for Development and Environment (CDE) of the University of Berne, Switzerland names the river "Kuru" for its entire length. OpenStreetMap names the river "Chel" up to 8.8138°N 26.9241°E north, where it is joined by an unnamed river from the right, and names it "Kuru" north of this point.) is a stream in the South Sudanese states of Western Bahr el Ghazal and Northern Bahr el Ghazal. It is a headwater of the Lol River.

== Course ==
The Kuru or Chel River forms in the south of Western Bahr el Ghazal on the border with the Central African Republic. It flows north, passing the road that runs west to Deim Zubeir from Ibra on its east bank, and enters Northern Bahr el Ghazal. It is joined from the left by the Biri River at 7.963864°N 26.422321°E on the state boundary.

The river passes Arroyo and joins a major tributary from the left around 8.8138°N 26.9241°E, just east of the Ashana Game Reserve. The river continues north to join the Magadhik River between Marial Bai to the west and Nyamlell to the west. The combined streams form the Loll or Lol River.

== See also ==
- List of rivers of South Sudan

== Sources ==
- Map Sheet E: Western Bahr el Ghazal Sudan (PDF), Federal Department of Foreign Affairs 3003 Berne, Switzerland, September 2005
- "Way: Kuru (263214607)", OpenStreetMap
- "Western Bahr el Ghazal State Map (as of Dec 2016)" (PDF), ReliefWeb, OCHA
