= Joseph Mamer Manot =

South Sudanese Anglican bishop

Joseph Mamer Manot is a South Sudanese Anglican bishop. He was consecrated as bishop suffragan on 10 June 2017 and enthroned as the first bishop of the Diocese of Wanyjok in the Province of the Episcopal Church of South Sudan on 28 April 2019.
