= Romolo Gessi =

Italian soldier, governor in the Turkish-Egyptian administration and explorer

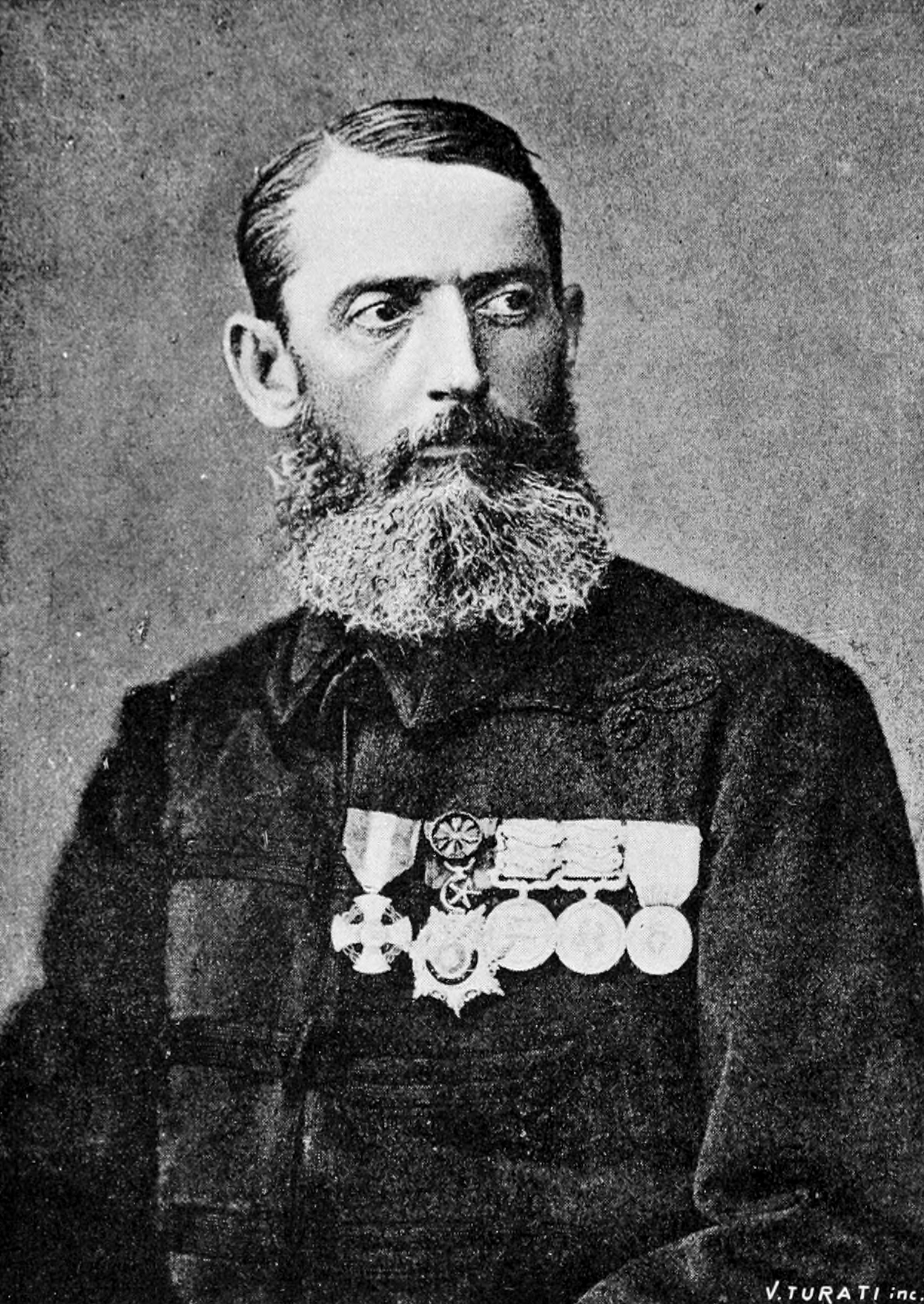
Romolo Gessi, photographed in Sudan by Richard Buchta

Romolo Gessi (30 April 1831 – 1 May 1881), also called Gessi Pasha, was an Italian soldier, governor in the Turkish-Egyptian administration and explorer of north-east Africa, who described the course of the White Nile in 19th-century Sudan and modern Uganda.

Gessi was born to an Italian father and Armenian mother from Istanbul in Ravenna, in Romagna. He acquired his military experience serving in the volunteer corps of Garibaldi in 1859 and 1860. He was one of numerous Garibaldi volunteers who went on to be regular soldiers, not only in the new Italian army, but in several others.

== Service in the British Empire in the Crimea and Sudan ==
Gessi fought with the British forces in the Crimean War (1854–55), where he first met General Charles George Gordon. Gordon later described him as "Italian subject, aged 49 (in 1881). Short, compact figure; cool, most determined man. Born genius for practical ingenuity in mechanics. Ought to have been born in 1560, not 1832. Same disposition as Francis Drake. Had been engaged in many petty political affairs. Was interpreter to Her Majesty's Forces in the Crimea, and attached to the headquarters of the Royal Artillery."

In 1876, while serving under governor-general Gordon in the Turkish Sudan, he explored the course of the White Nile in the area of Bahr El Jebel and mapped its descent from Lake Albert. He then ventured in the territory of the Oromo people, later becoming governor of the Bahr-el-Ghazal province, where he struggled against Sebehr and the slave trade and also was active in the deployment of gum arabic. Gordon regarded him, perhaps unfairly, as a brilliant mercenary –perhaps he did not come up to Gordon's standards of noncomformist rectitude.

In 1880, while returning to Khartoum, he found the Nile obstructed and was held up for three months in the Sudd, becoming ill. This illness led to his death, shortly after his return to Suez. In 1881, Muhammad Rauf Pasha, Gordon's successor at Khartoum, appointed Frank Lupton governor of the Bahr el Ghazal in place of Gessi.

After his death, his son Felice published his father's memoirs in the book, Sette anni nel Sudan egiziano (Milano, 1891).

== Sources ==
- Macro, E. (1947), "Frank Miller Lupton", Sudan Notes and Records, 28, University of Khartoum: 50–61, JSTOR 41716507
- Moorehead, Alan (1960). The White Nile. New York: Harper & Brothers Publishers.
- Zaccaria, Massimo: Il flagello degli schiavisti: (Romolo Gessi in Sudan, 1874–1881), Fernandel scientifica, Ravenna, 1999, p. 272; ISBN 88-87433-08-9, ISBN 978-88-87433-08-1
