= Aweil East County =

Coordinates: 09°00′N 27°36′E

- County

- Location in South Sudan
- Country: South Sudan
- Region: Bahr el Ghazal
- State: Northern Bahr el Ghazal

Area
  - Total: 6,172.23 sq mi (15,986.0 km^{2})

Population (2017 estimate)
  - Total: 571,728
  - Density: 92.6291/sq mi (35.7643/km^{2})
- Time zone: UTC+2 (CAT)

Aweil East County is a county in South Sudan.

== Location ==
The county is located in the eastern part of Northern Bahr el Ghazal state, in northern South Sudan, close to the border with the Republic of Sudan. It is bordered by South Darfur State to the north, Abyei Region to the northeast, Twic County in Warrap State to the east, Gogrial West County, also in Warrap State, to the southeast, Aweil South County to the south, Aweil West County to the southwest and Aweil North County to the northwest. it has eight administrative payams Baac, Yargot, Madhol, Malual baai, Mangar tong, Mayom wel, Mangok and Wunlang

Wanyjok, one of the towns in the county, is located approximately 42 kilometres (26 mi), by road, northeast of Aweil, the nearest large town and the capital of Bahr el Ghazal Region. This location lies approximately 801 kilometres (498 mi), by road, northwest of Juba, the capital and largest city in that country. The coordinates of the county are: 9° 0' 0.00"N, 27° 36' 0.00"E (Latitude: 9.0000; Longitude: 27.6000). Other Main towns are Malualkon, Madhol, Warawar, Malualbaai, Akuemkou and Yargot.

The incumbent commissioner for Aweil East County is Hon. Kerubino Thiep Tong

== Population ==
The 2008 Sudanese census estimated the population of Torit County at approximately 309,920 Although these results were disputed by the South Sudanese authorities, they are the only recent figures available and form a basis on which newer population surveys can be based.

== Administrative divisions ==
Aweil East County is made up of seven (8) payams (sub-counties), namely:

1. Wunlang Payam
2. Baac Payam
3. Mangok Payam which includes Aweilic boma of which marketing is in Ajaac Market
4. Madhol Payam (Abiem East Agurpiny marol and joungdit yor lual)
5. Malualbaai Payam Abiem East Luo Aguer geng and wundeng yai...
6. Mangartong Payam
7. Yargot Payam
8. Mayom Wel
