= Simon Uber Mawut =

South Sudanese politician

Governor of Northern Bahr el Ghazal
- In office 8 July 2023 – 11, December, 2025
- Preceded by: Tong Akeen Ngor
- Succeeded by: Charles Madut Akol

Personal details
- Born: January 1, 1968 (age 58) Barmayen, Aweil Center County
- Party: Sudan People's Liberation Movement
- Occupation: Politician

Simon Uber Mawut is a South Sudanese politician who served as governor of Northern Bahr el Ghazal state, Aweil, South Sudan. He took office on 8 July 2024. when H.E Salva Kiir relieved Tong Akeen Ngor and appointed him as the governor of Northern Bhar el Ghazal— Aweil.
