= Aweil West County =

Coordinates: 09°00′N 27°00′E

- County
- Nickname: Malual Buoth Anyar

- Location in South Sudan
- Country: South Sudan
- State: Northern Bahr el Ghazal

Area
  - Total: 1,932 sq mi (5,004 km^{2})

Population (2017 estimate)
  - Total: 236,402
  - Density: 122.4/sq mi (47.24/km^{2})
- Time zone: UTC+2 (CAT)

Aweil West County is an administrative area in Northern Bahr el Ghazal, South Sudan.

== Location ==
Aweil West county, one of the 5 counties of Northern Bahr el Ghazal State, is bordered by Aweil North County to the north, Aweil East County to the east, Aweil Centre County to the south and Raga County in Western BAhr el Ghazal State to the west.

The county headquarters is located in Nyamlel Town. This is the administrative centre where the county Commissioner, Hon. Abuol Akok Akok sits. Nyamlel is the largest town in Aweil West County. Other important towns include Marialbaai, Udhum, Maduany, Wedwil, Aguat, Paan Tiit, Mayom Akuakrel, Ajook, Nyinbuoli, Achanna among others

Aweil West County gave birth to Aweil North County in 2002 following a creation of more counties in Northern Bahr el Ghazal State. The reason for curving out Aweil North from Aweil West was to take services closer to people who cannot access them in Aweil West. Administratively, the population was on rise and so there was a need to create more administrative units. The county is located in Northern Bahr el Ghazal State, in northwestern South Sudan, close to the border with the Republic of Sudan. The county is majorly known for its vast agricultural lands boosting food production, pasture lands, rivers notably river lol, streams, and vibrant population. The county is birthplace and hometown of liberators such as General Santino Deng Wol, General Peter Dut Biar, General Madut Dut Yel, General Charles Dut Akol, Gen Albino Akol Akol, General Angon Ungom Chut, General Garang Angong Adel, General Bak Akoon, General Salva Chol Ayat among others. Other important people include; Late Wol Mawien Diing, Late Sultan Mawien Diing Akol, Late Sultan Kuach Mayiel, Late Sultan Akot Autiak, Late Sultan Aleu Jok, Late Sultan Dhieu Duang, Late Sultan Riiny Lual and the list is long

Aweil West County has been birthplace to many decorated youths like William Kur Makur Deng, Thomas Thiep Mawien, Baak Noon Macham, Raphael Piol Deng, Jackson Kur Akot Ayii, Lual Lual Atak, Lual Deng Lual, Bak Bak Akoon etc.

== Payams of Aweil West County ==
The county is made up of the following payams (sub-counties):
Chelkou (Gomjuer West)
Maduany (Meiriam East)
Marialbaai (Ayat East)
Mayom Akoon (Gomjuer Ctr.)
Mayom Akuangrel (Ayat Ctr.)
Nyinbuoli (Ayat West)
Udhum (Meiriam West)
Wedweil (Gomjuer East)
Achanna (Achanna)

== Population ==
According to the 2018 South Sudanese census, the population of Aweil West County was about 166,220. Although these figures were disputed by the authorities in Juba, South Sudan, they are the only recently available population figures and form a baseline on which future estimations can be based.

According to the recent population estimate survey in 2021, the county overall population was estimated at 390,370

== See also ==
- Aweil
- Aweil Airport
- Northern Bahr el Ghazal
- Bahr el Ghazal
