= Frank Lupton =

British sailor, a.k.a., Lupton Bey (1854–1888)

Frank Thomas Miller Lupton
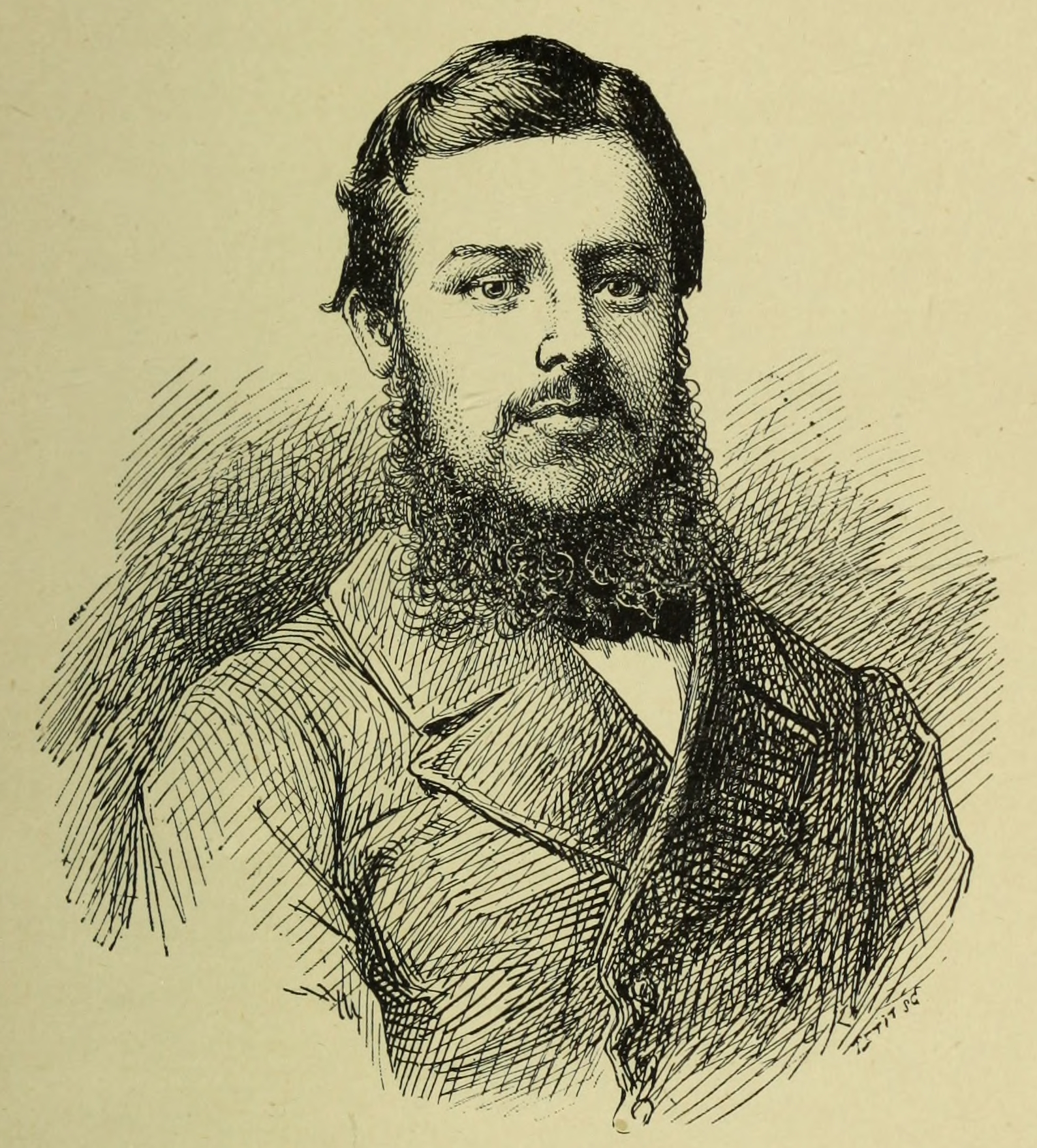
- Lupton from Stanley's Emin Pasha Expedition, by A. J. Wauters (1890)
- Born: 5 May 1854; Little Ilford, Essex, England
- Died: 8 May 1888 (aged 34); Omdurman, reinterment Khartoum Sudan.
- Other name: Lupton Bey
- Occupation: Colonial administrator
- Known for: Governor of the Bahr el Ghazal region, during the Mahdist uprising.

Frank Thomas Miller Lupton, or Lupton Bey, (1854 – 8 May 1888) was a British sailor who served as an administrator in the Egyptian Sudan. He was governor of Bahr el Ghazal province in 1881 at the start of the Mahdist War. Cut off from supplies and reinforcements, he had to surrender the province in 1884. After an initial period of freedom he was enchained for ten months. He was freed but struggled to make a living, his health deteriorated and he died in poverty. He had married a local woman who survived him, as did their two daughters.

== Early years ==
Frank Miller Lupton was born in Little Ilford, Essex, England on May 5, 1854, son of a local merchant. When he was 24 he joined the Mercantile Marine and became first officer of a steamship in the Red Sea on the route between Jedda and Suakin. In 1879 he joined a camel caravan in Suakin that crossed the mountains and desert to Berber, then went on to Khartoum. He met Governor General Gordon, who gave him command of a flotilla of river steamers that Gordon was sending to relieve the governor of the Equatorial province, Emin Pasha, in Lado.

Lupton took nearly two years to cut a passage through the dense vegetation of the Sudd. When he reached Lado he found that Emin did not want to be relieved. He became Emin's deputy, in charge of the Latuka district based at Tarangole. For several months he warded off attacks by the Lango and Didinga in the Imatong Mountains.

== Governor of Bahr el Ghazal ==
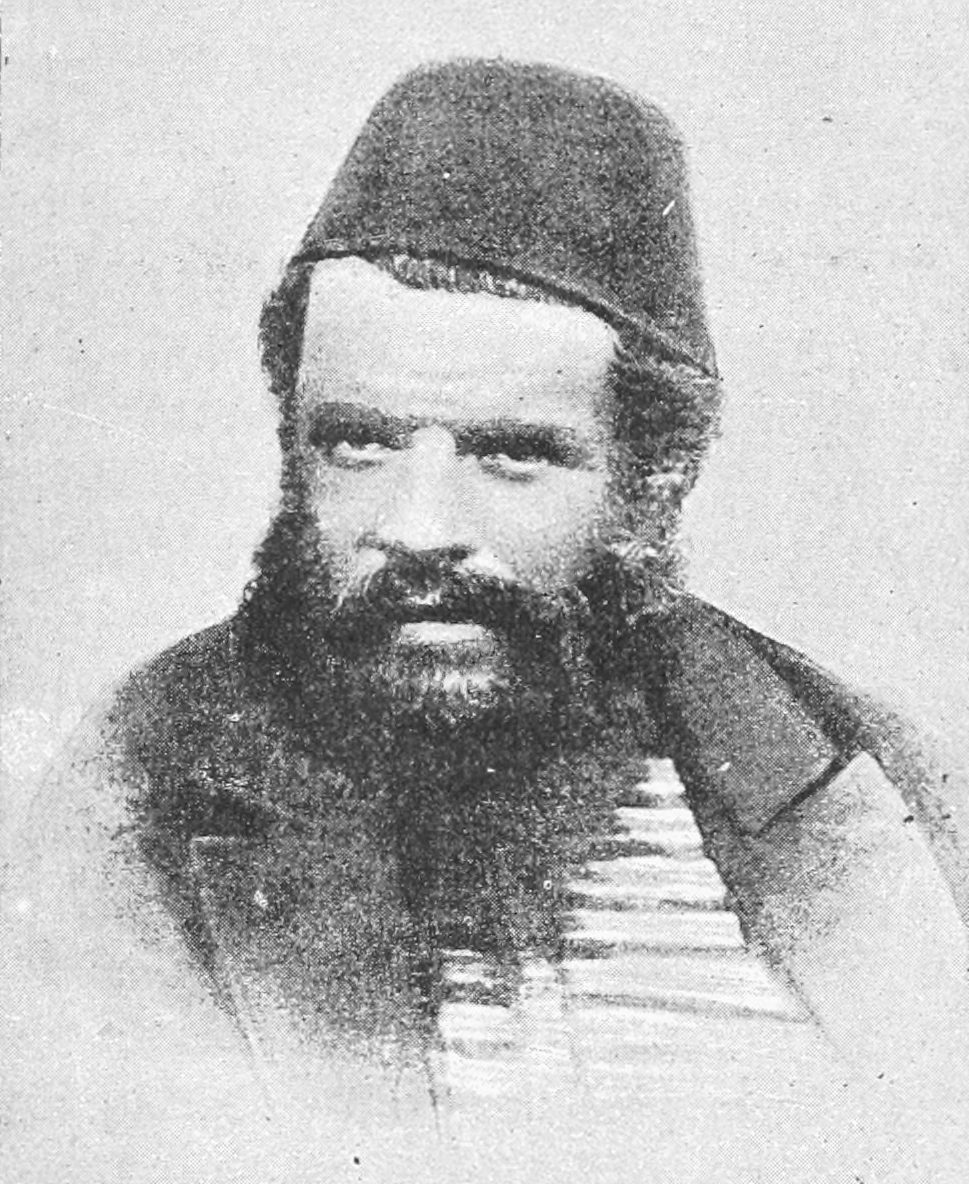
Lupton Bey, governor of the Bahr el-Ghazal province (1892)

In the 1870s the Egyptians had decided to strengthen their control of the Bahr al-Ghazal and of the slave and ivory traders operating from there. In 1881 Muhammad Rauf Pasha, Gordon's successor at Khartoum, appointed Lupton governor of the Bahr el Ghazal in place of Gessi Pasha. In July 1881 Lupton went to Khartoum to meet Rauf Pasha and receive his instructions. Lupton sent word to Emin about the activity of the self-proclaimed Mahdi Muhammad Ahmad on Aba Island, which Emin received in Lado on 19 December 1881. Lupton returned from Khartoum and made his base in Bahr el Ghazal at Deim Suliman, now Deim Zubeir. He brought with him a beautiful young woman from Shendi named Zenuba. She gave birth to a daughter in 1882 whom Lupton named Fanna.

When he arrived in Deim Suliman, Lupton received orders to send almost all his regular forces to Khartoum. To replace them he gave 900 Remington rifles to his mostly Dinka irregulars. Around 1880 many Azande chiefs had placed themselves at the disposal of the Egyptians, who were represented by Europeans such as Lupton and Romolo Gessi, in part to fight the slavers. Possibly the Azande would have been a better choice as irregular forces than the Dinkas, who were sympathetic to the Mahdists.

In August 1882 the Mahdist Sheikh Jango attacked some of Lupton's bashi-bazouks at Liffi and gained the surrender of the inhabitants. Lupton took 600 men to the scene but Jango had retreated. Lupton went back to Deim Suliman, then to Mashra-er-Req where he defeated some rebels of the Janghe tribe. He took 2,000 men to Tel Gauna where he defeated Sheikh Jango. On 27 January 1883 Lupton was at Dembo when his military commander Major Mahmoud Effendi Abdallah returned from a campaign against the Shat tribe in very poor health. On 1 February 1883 Lupton's chief Ruffai Agha fought off another attack by Sheikh Jango in the Liffi district. Ruffai Aghe entrenched his force near Dembo, but was attacked by Mahdists in September and killed with almost all his men.

During this period the governor of Darfur, Slatin Bey, sent several requests to Lupton for reinforcements, which Lupton could not provide. Lupton in return sent futile requests for supplies and reinforcements to Emin in Lado. On 11 February 1883 Lupton wrote to Emin telling him that more of his men had deserted. On 2 April 1883 Lupton wrote to Dr. Wilhelm Junker telling him that his force of 2,000 men was expecting to be attacked any day. He sent 400 men south to Rol to join forces sent north by Emin, and the ensuing campaign captured a large amount of cattle. However, he could not afford the 17,000 rounds of ammunition he gave to Emin's troops. Some of the first tribes to join the Mahdists were those around Jebel Telkanna, who then invaded the Dinka country. Lupton hastened to meet them, and defeated the rebels in two encounters.

By June 1883 it was becoming clear to Lupton that his position was hopeless. He had lost his best troops, was short of ammunition and could trust nobody. In August he marched from Jur Ghattas to Meshra-er-Req, where the steamer Ismailia had brought stores from Khartoum. He sent Satti Effendi back to Khartoum on the Ismailia to ask for more help, but Satti later went over to the Mahdists. Lupton returned to Deim Suliman, and repulsed an attack by the tribes. By this time he was short of ammunition and was down to four companies of bashi-bazouks and some bazingers (freed slaves). In January 1884 Lupton wrote to Emin telling him that Hicks had been wiped out in the Battle of Shaykan and Slatin had surrendered Darfur. The Mahdist Emir Karamallah was approaching Deim Suliman, and wrote to Lupton demanding his surrender. Lupton had 1,200 regular troops with four guns and four rocket troops. At a conference with his officers he was told that they would not resist. He had to formally transfer the province to Karamallah.

In early 1884, a joint campaign by Mahdist rebels led by Emir Karam Allah Kurkusawi, a former merchant, and local Southern forces defeated the Turkish-Egyptian rule in Bahr El Ghazal, almost one year before the fall of Khartoum. According to the Austrian Rudolf Carl von Slatin Pasha, one of Kurkusawi's brothers had served as a commander under Lupton Bey and therefore managed to convince most of the Ottoman officers and troops to defect. On 21 April 1884, having fought for eighteen months against the Islamist insurgents, Lupton was compelled to surrender to Kurkusawi in Deim Zubeir.

== Captivity and death ==
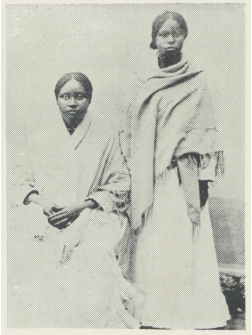
Lupton's daughters, Fatma and Nafisa, c. 1900

Lupton surrendered Bahr el Ghazal to Emir Karamallah on 28 April 1884. His headquarters was looted, with all records burned, and his soldiers were enslaved. He was invited to become a Muslim, but said he was one already. He set off with his wife and daughter, Major Abdallah and a small party to walk to Shakka, where the Emir Abdel-el-Gader showed them the battlefield where the force under Hicks had been wiped out. Lupton reached El Obeid in September 1884. At this time he still had his freedom, and was still with his family. In October 1884 Lupton was arrested and sent to Omdurman, and reached the Mahdi's camp on 17 October 1884, where he met Slatin Bey for the first time. With Slatin's help he was allowed to see the Khalifa, who let him bring his family and servants into the camp. He was presented to the Mahdi, then moved to Omdurman. There he and Slatin were suspected of trying to join Gordon in Khartoum and were enchained.

After tactful negotiations by Slatin their chains were removed in September 1885 and Lupton joined his family in their tent in the Beit-el-Mal. Lupton was more or less free, but was desperate and struggled to obtain food or money for his family. A second daughter was born to Zenuba in July 1886 whom they named Victoria. Lupton found work repairing steamers in the dockyard which gave him just enough to live on, and also found a job making ammunition. His eyesight was badly damaged in an explosion. He received some money from his family, although most of it had been stolen. He suffered from a form of meningitis, and died from Tuberculosis in delirium on 8 May 1888. His wife remarried.

== Legacy ==
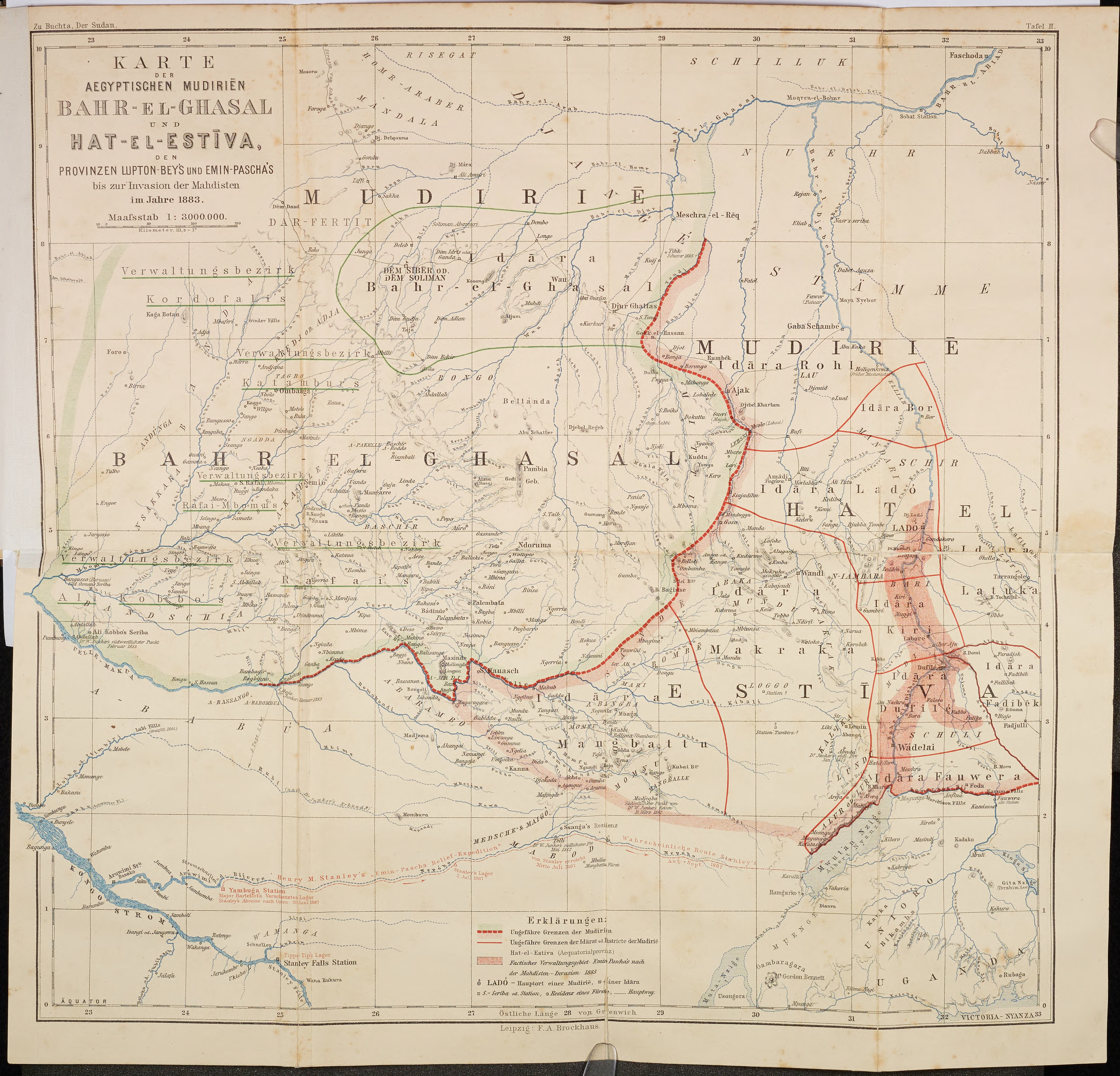
Lupton's map of Bahr el Ghazal, published May 1884

In May 1884 the Royal Geographical Society published Mr. Frank Lupton's (Lupton Bey) Geographical Observations in The Bahr-el-Ghazal Region: With Introductory Remarks By Malcom Lupton. It contained 12 pages of narrative and a folding color map which covers the area between Darfur in the north and the Stanley Falls in the south. It takes the form of a letter to T.P. Hearne written by Lupton on 5–6 November 1883 from the zeriba of Jur Ghattas. It describes the Denka (Dinka), Golo, Sehre, and Jur tribes, but its main subject is the rivers of the region. Lupton corrected the 1877 map by August Heinrich Petermann and another by Georg August Schweinfurth, and commented on maps by Wilhelm Junker and Juan Maria Schuver. He also discussed trade in rubber, ivory and slaves, mining, exploitation of cotton, gum, tamarind and timber, and tribal warfare.

== Sources ==
- Abol, Kuyok (2015), "Awutiek", South Sudan: The Notable Firsts, Bloomington: AuthorHome
- Collins, Robert O. (1971), Land Beyond the Rivers : The Southern Sudan 1898–1918, New Haven / London: Yale University Press, ISBN 978-0300014068
- Luffin, Xavier (2004), "The Use Of Arabic As A Written Language In Central Africa The Case Of The Uele Basin (Northern Congo) In The Late Nineteenth Century" (PDF), Sudanic Africa, 15: 145–177, archived from the original (PDF) on 2021-10-27
- Macro, E. (1947), "Frank Miller Lupton", Sudan Notes and Records, 28, University of Khartoum: 50–61, JSTOR 41716507
- Mr. Frank Lupton's (Lupton Bey) Geographical Observations in The Bahr-el-Ghazal Region: With Introductory Remarks By Malcom Lupton., AbeBooks
- Slatin, Rudolf Carl von (1914), Fire and sword in the Sudan : a personal narrative of fighting and serving the Dervishes, 1879–1895, London: Edward Arnold
- Vetch, Robert Hamilton (1911). "Egypt/3 History" . In Chisholm, Hugh (ed.). Encyclopædia Britannica. Vol. 9 (11th ed.). Cambridge University Press. pp. 80–130, see page 127, para 5. "The Bahr-el-Ghazal"
