= Raga River =

- Location within South Sudan

Location
- Country: South Sudan
- State: Western Bahr el Ghazal

Physical characteristics
- Mouth: Boro River
  - coordinates: 8.702262°N 25.875165°E

The Raga River is a river of South Sudan, a right tributary of the Boro River.

== Course ==
The Raga River rises in Western Bahr el Ghazal near the border with Haut-Mbomou in the Central African Republic. It flows in a northeast direction past the town of Raga to its confluence with the Boro.

== Health ==
The river is home to Onchocerca volvulus, the parasite that causes Onchocerciasis, which causes blindness and is a serious public health issue. The disease is mainly concentrated on villages who use the river for fishing, drinking, bathing and washing.

== Sources ==
- Onchocerciasis control programme (PDF), World Health Organization, September 1985
- "Way: Raga River (200829470)", OpenStreetMap
