= Aweil South County =

County in Northern Barh el Ghazal, South Sudan

- County
- Country: South Sudan
- Region: Bahr el Ghazal
- State: Northern Bahr el Ghazal

Area
  - Total: 763 sq mi (1,976 km^{2})

Population (2017 estimate)
  - Total: 104,385
  - Density: 136.8/sq mi (52.83/km^{2})
- Time zone: UTC+2 (CAT)

Aweil South County, sometimes called Paliet, is an administrative area in Northern Bahr el Ghazal state, in the Bahr el Ghazal region of South Sudan, bordering Warrap State to the south. It is located in the southeastern part of NBGs. It is also known by the name Paliet, and one of the counties consisting of three major Dinka tribal groups: Ajak, Boncuai and Kongdeer. It was founded in 2000 and headquartered in Boncuai in a place called Mangar-Gier. In 2004, the headquarters were shifted to Malek Alel in Ajak. It is bordered to the north by Aweil East and to the west by Aweil Centre, to the south east by Gogrial State, and to the southwest by Western Barh el Ghazal state respectively.

Payams in Aweil South County:

1. Tiar-aleit (payam)
2. Panthou Payam
3. Nyieth Payam
4. Wathmuok Payam
5. Nyoucawine Payam
6. Ayai Payam
7. Gakrool Payam
8. Tarweng Payam

== Demography ==
2008 Census population: 73,806

2020 Population projection*: 138,460

Ethnic groups and languages: Rek Dinka (Malual-Paliet), Luo/‘Jur Chol’

Displacement Figures: 14,466 IDPs and 26,630 returnees (Q1 2020)

January 2020 IPC Projections: January 2020 – Crisis (Phase 3); February to April 2020 – Crisis (Phase 3); May to July – Emergency (Phase 4)

== Economy and Livelihood ==
Aweil South County is located in Northern Bahr el-Ghazal State. It borders Aweil Centre to the west and Aweil East to the north. It also borders Warrap State(Gogrial West County) to the east and Western Bahr el-Ghazal State (Jur River County) to the south.

The county falls under the western flood plains sorghum and cattle livelihood zone (FEWSNET, 2018), with grassland, swampy areas with papyrus reed, and pockets of forest being found in this area. According to a 2018 report by FAO and WFP, approximately 70% of households are estimated to engage in farming. The main crops in this region are sorghum, sesame, maize, groundnut and vegetables. The state agriculture minister has stressed the importance of using ox ploughs and in late 2015 announced the county had recently trained 750 ox-plough bulls.

The economy of Aweil South – and Northern Bahr el-Ghazal more broadly – has undergone a major transformation towards markets and commercialisation of labour. Decades of conflict and insecurity within South Sudan and across the border in Darfur/Kordofan have accelerated pre-existing patterns of migration through forced displacement from Aweil to Sudan and elsewhere. The rapid repopulation of the area since the early 2000s placed the local markets and ecology under such pressure that cash and markets became an increasingly vital means for survival. Periodic closures of the border with Sudan (with which local markets have been historically integrated), runaway inflation and widespread insecurity since 2012 have further deepened this trend. This has been reflected in high levels of food insecurity, indebtedness and exploitation as part of agricultural labour or participation in armed groups (Kindersley and Majok 2019).

This structural economic transformation partly explains why food insecurity has continued to be a challenge for Northern Bahr el-Ghazal State despite its relative stability. Aweil South County was classified as being at Crisis (IPC Phase 3) levels of food insecurity at the beginning of 2016. During 2020, IPC projections estimate that the county will remain at this level, until mid-year when it is expected to increase to Emergency (IPC Phase 4) levels of food insecurity. Flooding is a regular concern for both agriculturalists and pastoralists. Aweil South County is the county most prone to flooding in Northern Bahr el Ghazal State. An Associated Press article documented that communities in Aweil South were verging on famine in early 2017, and starting to depend increasingly on foraging for wild foods to supplement their diet (Mednick, 2017). The few food distributions points in the area at the time were often too far for rural residents to access. According to an IRC report from 2018, 60% of children that needed interventions due to malnourishment were not receiving it. Floods in 2019 led to parts of the county being submerged, and land typically used to grow staples such as cereal was impacted.

== Infrastructure and Services ==
Aweil South's county headquarters is located in Nyocawany Payam. While the county does not share a border with Sudan, its proximity means that insecurity and border closures have at times impacted trade and migration routes from the area.

OCHA's (2019) Humanitarian Needs Overview for 2020 indicated that over 83,000 people have significant humanitarian needs in Aweil South, which represents almost 79% of the estimated population for the county reported in the HNO. The severity of these needs are considered to be among the highest in the country, particularly in terms of health services. Access to healthcare facilities presents a challenge for Aweil South residents, particularly to alleviate the impact of food insecurity. A 2018 REACH assessment found that 60% of malnourished children were not receiving treatment, with the primary reason being that caregivers would have to travel long distances with the children and the rainy season made it even more difficult to travel this distance. An outbreak of measles in 2019 led to humanitarian interventions through vaccination campaigns to contain the outbreak and prevent it from spreading further to neighbouring counties.

== Conflict Dynamics ==
Communal clashes have affected Aweil South County. In 2013, the county was a part of the Gogrial Agreement between four counties (Aweil East, Twic, and Gogrial West) to address communal clashes over grazing land, water sources and revenge attacks (PA-X, 2013). Additionally, in 2014 UNMISS facilitated a peace forum in the area to address tensions regarding county boundaries with Aweil East and Gogrial West (UNMISS, 2014).

== Administration and Logistics ==
Payams listed in Government and UN documents: Nyocawany I (County Headquarters), Ayai, Gakorl/Gakrol, Nyieth, Nyocawany II, Panthou, Tar-weng, Tiar-aleit, Wathmuok

Alternative list of payams provided by local actors:Nyocawany (County Headquarters), Ayai, Gakorl/Gakrol, Majok-Abyei, Nyieth, Panthou, Tiar-aleit, Wathmuok

== Roads ==
- A primary road that runs from Aweil Town to Wau Town is accessible from Aweil South. In the rainy season of 2019 the Logistics Cluster issued a “road warning” for the route, however the road was open during the dry season.
- A secondary road runs across Aweil South, connecting its important villages such as Wuncum, Panthou and Tiaraliet to state capital Aweil Town at the county's west and to Akun in Warrap State to the county's east. Seasonal road conditions are unknown.

== Notable people ==
- Dr. Bellario Ahoy Ngong, former chairperson for HIV/AIDS commission, GOSS
- Arkanjelo Athian Teng, former deputy Governor
- Ateny Wek Ateny, speaker of the president of The Republic of South Sudan
- Jal Malith Jal, former Governor of Aweil State
- Arthur Akuien Chol, first Minister of finance of the Republic of South Sudan
- William Ajal Deng Gai state Minister of Justice, Republic of Sudan.
- Angelo Atak Akol, former state Minister of Education, NBGS
- Kongdeer Dut Jok former governor of NBGS
- Joseph Ajuong Mayuol the first governor of NBGS

Lawrence Lual Lual Akuey, former deputy speakerof the national legislative assembly

- Ustaz Wek Kuch Deng, former Minister of information, NBGS

Deng Deng Hoch Yai, former national Minister of general Education and instruction

UNHAS-recognised Heli and Fixed-Wing Airplane Airstrips: None
