= Aweil East State =

State of South Sudan from 2015 to 2020

Aweil East Abiem Peaceland
- State
- Nickname: Home Of Peace
- Motto: Unity, Peace and Justice
- Location of Aweil East State in South Sudan
- Country: South Sudan
- Capital: Wanyjok
- Number of Counties: 14
- Number of Municipalities: 2
- Established: 2 October 2015
- Extinct: 22 February 2020

Population (2018 Estimate)
  - Total: 571,728
- Demonym(s): Wanyjokish, Abiemese

Aweil East also known as Abiem, was a state in South Sudan that existed between 2 October 2015 and 22 February 2020. It had an estimated population of 571,728 people and an area of 6,172.23 KM square. It was located in northern-western South Sudan. Its capital and largest city was Wanyjok. The state is located in the Bahr el Ghazal region and it bordered Twic State and Gogrial State to the east, Aweil State to the south, Lol State to the west, the disputed Abyei State region to the northeast, and Sudan to the north.

== History ==
The state initially existed as Aweil East County when Aweil gained state-establishment from Wau, South Sudan in 1994 according to Sudan. On 2 October 2015, President Salva Kiir officially declared and issued a decree establishing 28 states in place of the 10 constitutionally established states. The decree established the new states largely along ethnic lines. A number of opposition parties and civil society groups challenged the constitutionality of the decree. Kiir later resolved to take it to parliament for approval as a constitutional amendment. In November the South Sudanese parliament empowered President Kiir to create new states.

Deng Deng Akuei was appointed Governor on 24 December 2015.

=== Nicknames ===
The state is nicknamed as The Home of Peace, because communities in Abiem and neighbouring Sudan make peace by themselves.

== Geography ==
The state was located in the Bahr el Ghazal region with an estimated population of 571,728 and it bordered Twic State and Gogrial State to the east, Aweil State to the south, Lol State to the west, the disputed Abyei State region to the northeast, and Sudan to the north.

=== Administrative divisions ===
After Aweil East formed, the state split up even further into eight separate counties. These eight counties are Wunlang County, Malualbaai County, Warguet County, Yargot County, Madhol County, Mangok County, Baac County, Mangar-Tong County, Rialdit County, Manyiel County, Riang-Maal County, Mangok-Lou County and Warlang County. In addition to the 5 counties, it also consists of municipality of Malualkon and Majok Yinh Thiou.

=== Malualkon ===
Malualkon was the capital city of Aweil East. It comprised Wanyjok, Machar Mou, Mabil, Pan Apuoth, Kanajak, Paroot, Majak Ajuong, Majak Akoon, Riang Tab, and Malualkon. The Wer Bei Radio which broadcasts the word of God is found to north-east of the city and Nhomlau FM radio stationed in Malualkon to the east. Because of its proximity to South and West Kordofan, commercial goods from Sudan come through Abyei (Akong border location) and Majokyinthiou via Merem locality and later supply the markets in the other sisterly states of Lol and Aweil states.
