= Raga, South Sudan =

Raga
- Town
- Location in South Sudan
- Coordinates: 08°28′12″N 25°40′48″E
- Country: South Sudan
- Region: Bahr el Ghazal
- State: Western Bahr el Ghazal
- County: Raga County
- Elevation: 1,788 ft (545 m)

Population (2010 Estimate)
  - Total: 3,700
- Time zone: UTC+2 (CAT)

Raga is a town in South Sudan.

== Location ==
The town is located in the Raga County of Western Bahr el Ghazal, in the Bahr el Ghazal region of South Sudan, near the International borders with the Republic of Sudan and the Central African Republic. It is located approximately 300 kilometres (190 mi), by road, northwest of Wau, the capital of Western Bahr el Ghazal State. This location lies approximately 950 kilometres (590 mi), by road, northwest of Juba, the capital and largest city in that country. The coordinates of Raga are: 8° 28' 12.00"N, 25° 40' 48.00"E (Latitude: 8.4700; Longitude: 25.6800). Raga's average elevation is 545 metres (1,788 ft) above sea level.

== Climate ==
Köppen-Geiger climate classification system classifies its climate as tropical wet and dry (Aw).

Climate data for Raga (1961–1990)
Month	Jan	Feb	Mar	Apr	May	Jun	Jul	Aug	Sep	Oct	Nov	Dec	Year
Record high °C (°F)	40.6 (105.1)	41.6 (106.9)	43.7 (110.7)	42.7 (108.9)	41.5 (106.7)	39.0 (102.2)	36.7 (98.1)	36.2 (97.2)	36.4 (97.5)	38.2 (100.8)	38.7 (101.7)	40.3 (104.5)	43.7 (110.7)
Mean daily maximum °C (°F)	34.2 (93.6)	35.8 (96.4)	37.3 (99.1)	37.5 (99.5)	35.1 (95.2)	32.5 (90.5)	30.7 (87.3)	30.8 (87.4)	31.8 (89.2)	33.2 (91.8)	34.6 (94.3)	34.2 (93.6)	34.0 (93.2)
Daily mean °C (°F)	22.1 (71.8)	24.8 (76.6)	28.0 (82.4)	29.3 (84.7)	28.7 (83.7)	26.5 (79.7)	25.7 (78.3)	25.7 (78.3)	26.1 (79.0)	26.4 (79.5)	25.0 (77.0)	23.2 (73.8)	26.0 (78.8)
Mean daily minimum °C (°F)	11.6 (52.9)	13.8 (56.8)	18.7 (65.7)	21.0 (69.8)	22.2 (72.0)	20.6 (69.1)	20.6 (69.1)	20.5 (68.9)	20.3 (68.5)	19.6 (67.3)	15.4 (59.7)	12.2 (54.0)	18.0 (64.4)
Record low °C (°F)	4.2 (39.6)	7.5 (45.5)	10.4 (50.7)	11.0 (51.8)	17.2 (63.0)	17.3 (63.1)	17.1 (62.8)	17.8 (64.0)	17.3 (63.1)	11.0 (51.8)	7.5 (45.5)	3.6 (38.5)	3.6 (38.5)
Average precipitation mm (inches)	0.5 (0.02)	1.6 (0.06)	19.7 (0.78)	48.8 (1.92)	123.4 (4.86)	167.1 (6.58)	227.4 (8.95)	254.9 (10.04)	176.0 (6.93)	84.4 (3.32)	37.8 (1.49)	0.0 (0.0)	1,141.6 (44.94)
Average precipitation days (≥ 0.1 mm)	0.1	0.5	1.9	4.8	10.3	11.1	15.1	16.1	12.7	7.8	0.7	0.0	81.1
Average relative humidity (%)	32	33	39	50	65	71	75	75	71	61	44	37	54.4
Mean monthly sunshine hours	300.7	263.2	254.2	249.0	241.8	207.0	189.1	207.7	207.0	235.6	273.0	313.1	2,941.4
Percentage possible sunshine	83	80	69	67	62	56	49	52	76	63	77	86	68
Source 1: NOAA
Source 2: Climate Charts

== Overview ==
Raga is a small but growing town that straddles the Raga River. Life in Raga has been described by a native author, Naomi Baki, who was raised in Raga till she was forced to leave the city at the age of 14.

== Population ==
It is estimated that the population of Raga was 3,700 in 2010.

== Transport ==
From Raga, the main road north (B41) leads to Al Murrah in the Republic of Sudan. B41-South leads to Wau, South Sudan. Raga is also served by Raga Airport.

== See also ==
- Raja County
- Raga Airport
- Western Bahr el Ghazal
- Bahr el Ghazal
