= Aweil North County =

- County
- Country: South Sudan
- State: Northern Bahr el Ghazal

Area
  - Total: 2,447 sq mi (6,338 km^{2})

Population (2017 estimate)
  - Total: 183,186
  - Density: 74.86/sq mi (28.90/km^{2})
- Time zone: UTC+2 (CAT)

Aweil North County, is a county of Northern Bahr el Ghazal state, South Sudan.

== See also ==
- Majak baai
