= Lol River =

- Location within South Sudan

Location
- Country: South Sudan
- State: Northern Bahr el Ghazal; Warrap

Physical characteristics
- Source
  - coordinates: 9.1097°N 26.9308°E
- Mouth: Lol River
  - coordinates: 9.282964°N 28.915630°E

Basin features
- Tributaries
  - right: Boro River, Sopo River

The Lol River, or Loll River, is a stream in northern South Sudan that feeds the Bahr al-Arab, known locally as the Kiir River.

== Course ==
The Lol River forms at the convergence of the Chel or Kuru River and the Magadhik River just west of Nyamlell in Northern Bahr el Ghazal. It flows east, passing Aweil to the south, and is joined by the Pongo River to the east of Akun in Warrap state. It enters Unity state just before turning north to join the Bahr el-Arab. It meets the larger river south of the disputed Abyei Area and roughly 100 kilometers west of Bentiu.

== See also ==
- List of rivers of South Sudan
