= Wanyjok, South Sudan =

Wanyjok
- Town
- Nickname: Young Lion
- Motto: Dinka: Koor thin nyɔt, tiam ee kida English: The Young Lion, the victory is ours
- Interactive map of Wanyjok
- Country: South Sudan
- Region: Bahr el Ghazal
- State: Northern Bahr el Ghazal
- County: Aweil East County
- Created: 2 October 2015; 10 years ago

Government
  - Type: Municipality
  - Mayor or Mayoress: Teresa Abak Piol
- Elevation: 770 m (2,530 ft)

Population (2008 Estimate)
  - Total: 309,921
- Demonym: Wanyjokish
- Time zone: UTC+3 (EAT)
- Climate: Tropical savanna climate
- Website: wanyjok.org

Wanjok (also known as Wanyjok) is a town in the Aweil East County, Republic of South Sudan.

== History ==
Wanyjok is in the state of Northern Bahr El Ghazal. It became the capital of the new state, Aweil East, when the president Salva Kiir created new states in South Sudan. It is again part of Northern Bahr el Ghazal since 2020.

== Educational people ==
The following people are the most regarded in the state:

- Madut Aluk

== Military people ==
- Paul Malong Awan

== See also ==
- Aweil East State
