= Aweil Centre County =

Aweil Center County
- County
- Country: South Sudan
- State: Northern Bahr el Ghazal

Area
  - Total: 4,304 sq mi (11,147 km^{2})

Population (2017 estimate)
  - Total: 59,356
  - Density: 13.791/sq mi (5.3248/km^{2})
- Time zone: UTC+2 (CAT)

Aweil Centre County is an administrative area in Northern Bahr el Ghazal, South Sudan.
