= Northern Bahr el Ghazal =

State of South Sudan

Northern Bahr el Ghazal Aweil Malual buöth Anyaar
- State
- Northern Bahr el Ghazal State
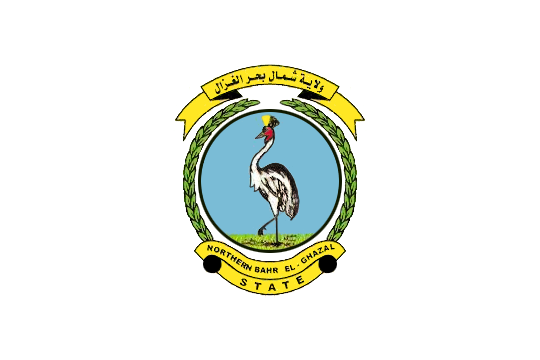
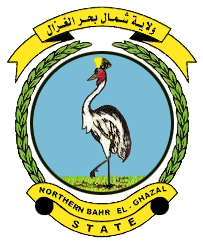
- Flag Seal
- Nickname: Mading Aweil
- Motto: Kɔn kɔc
- Location in South Sudan.
- Coordinates: 08°44′N 26°54′E
- Country: South Sudan
- Region: Bahr el Ghazal
- Capital: Aweil

Government
  - Governor: Charles Madut Akol
  - Vice Governor: Tong Lual Ayat

Area
  - Total: 30,543.30 km^{2} (11,792.83 sq mi)

Population (2017 estimate)
  - Total: 1,023,383
  - Density: 33.50597/km^{2} (86.78007/sq mi)
- Time zone: UTC+2 (CAT)
- HDI (2023): 0.3 low · 10th of 10

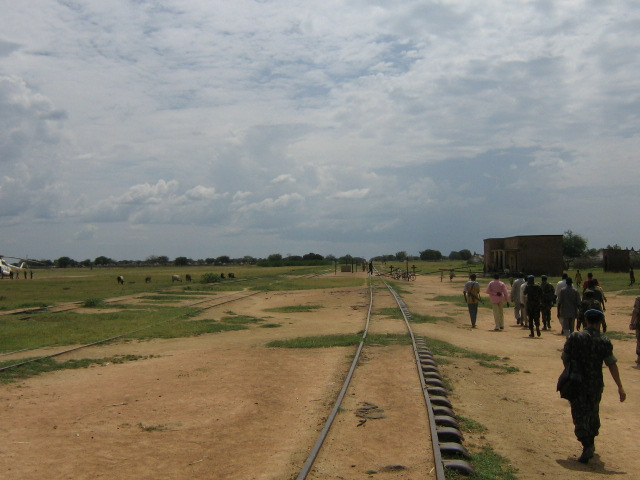
Malual Station

Northern Bahr el Ghazal (Arabic: ولاية شمال بحر الغزال) is a state in South Sudan. It has an area of 30,543 km^{2} and is part of the Bahr el Ghazal region. It borders East Darfur in Sudan to the north, Western Bahr el Ghazal to the west and south, and Warrap and the disputed region of Abyei to the east. Aweil is the capital of the state.

== History ==
Because of its proximity to Kordofan and the presence of a railway line through it to Wau, it suffered extensively in the 1983–2005 civil war in southern Sudan. North Bahr al Ghazal and adjacent parts of Western Kordofan to the north were among the most politically sensitive regions in Sudan. Missriya Arabs from Kordofan have interacted with Dinka in this region over a long time. While relations during the colonial era were largely peaceful, the war saw an upsurge in hostilities. Government backing to the Missriya gave them a decided advantage over local Dinka groups, and raiding by murahileen militias (and other government backed groups, including some Dinka militias) resulted in considerable loss of life, widespread abduction and pillaging of Dinka villages. Many of these raids coincided with the movement of government trains to and from Kordofan to Wau.

It had the highest rate of poverty, 76% according to government statistics, of the 10 states of South Sudan.

In October 2015, President Salva Kiir divided the original ten states of South Sudan into 28 states. Northern Bahr el Ghazal was divided into the new states of Aweil, Aweil East, and a part of Lol.

On 22 January 2020, Northern Bahr el Ghazal, along with the rest of the original ten states of South Sudan, was re-established at the conclusion of a peace agreement resolving the South Sudanese Civil War. Tong Aken Ngor, appointed by President Kiir as Governor of Aweil State in 2019, was sworn in as the Governor of Northern Bahr el Ghazal in the wake of the state's re-establishment.

== Geography ==
Situated in South Sudan's Bahr el Ghazal region, Northern Bahr el Ghazal occupies a majority of a region that is characterized by grassland floodplains and tropical savanna that make up around 33,559 km^{2}, extending outward into neighboring Western Bahr el Ghazal and Warrap. Each county is divided into three geographical areas of different ground and water height. These areas are locally referred to as low-, middle-, or highlands - though there are actually no highlands in the state. The lowlands are only accessible during the dry season because annually, from May through November, the areas are flooded. Each county also has their own intermittent rivers that locals use for drinking water.

The Lol River, which crosses the state, is a tributary of the Bahr al-Arab, flowing downstream from Unity, slicing westward through Warrap and Northern Bahr el Ghazal, and ending in Western Bahr el Ghazal.

=== Hazards ===
Annual floods are common throughout Northern Bahr el Ghazal, affecting residential areas. In 2008, a flood in Aweil South County displaced 40,000 people. In 2010, a flood took out 70% of livestock and crops in Aweil South County and Aweil West County; in Aweil, around 60% was destroyed. Thousands of people were greatly affected by the flood in 2010.

== Government ==
The Governor is the head of government with exclusive powers. The government is also divided into three bodies, The Executive headed by the Governor, The State Legislative Assembly (Aweil State Assembly), and a judiciary (Aweil State High Court). The State Assembly is a one house type of legislature, it is a house of representatives with each Payam having one representative elected through state primary elections. The current Governor and head of State government is Charles Madut Akol, appointed as the acting governor for the transition period on December 11, 2025 by President Salva Kiir.

He replaced the former governor, Simon Uber Mawut, and took his oath of office shortly after, taking over leadership of the state in late December.

Administration

Northern Bahr al Ghazal, like other states in South Sudan, is divided into counties; there are five counties, headed by a County Commissioner. Aweil East Commissioner Hon. Mawien Mawien Kuol appointed on 3rd August 2026 along with Aweil North Commissioner Hon. Akok Garang Akok, Hon Peter Natale of Aweil Centre County, Aweil South County of Hon. Luka Thel and Aweil West County with Hon. Abuol Akok Akok, as detailed below:

County	Area (km^{2})	Population Census 2008	County Headquarter
Aweil North	6,376.53	129,127	Gok Machar
Aweil East	6,172.23	309,921	Wanyjok
Aweil South	1,786.95	73,806	Malek Alel
Aweil West	5,030.22	166,217	Nyamlell
Aweil Central	11,177.40	41,827	Aweil

The counties are further divided into Payams, then Bomas.

== Infrastructure ==
By 2009, accessibility of Northern Bahr al Ghazal had been greatly improved. In 2007, the reconstruction of roads and bridges began. All county headquarters across the state were connected by all-weather roads with the exception of Aroyo, then the capital of Aweil Center County. In 2019, the Food and Agriculture Organization of the United Nations announced a project to develop multi-purpose water infrastructure in Koum. It is the lowest developed region of the entire globe according to the HDI.

SPLM Headquarters

== Books ==
- Francis M. Deng, 1995, War of Visions, Conflict of Identities in the Sudan, (Washington D.C.: Brookings)
- Human Rights Watch, 1999, Famine in Sudan, 1998, The Human Rights Causes, (New York, Human Rights Watch).
- Dave Eggers, 2006, What is the What, (New York, Vintage Books).
- David Keen, 1994, The Benefits of Famine, A Political Economy of Famine and Relief in Southwestern Sudan, 1983–1989, (New Jersey, Princeton University Press).
- Garang Malong, 2012, Theatre of Hope (Nairobi University, Kenya)
- Aweil graduates network (2013)
