= Yohannes Yual =

South Sudanese revolutionary

Major General Yohannes Yual Both
- Military career
- Allegiance: South Sudan Defense Forces
- Conflicts: Second Sudanese Civil War (1983–2005)

Major General Yohannes Yual Both (or Johannes Yoal Bath etc.) was a leader of the South Sudan Defense Forces whose mobile forces gave the Sudan People's Liberation Army considerable difficulty during the Second Sudanese Civil War (1983–2005).

In August 1991 Riek Machar, Lam Akol and Gordon Kong announced that John Garang had been ejected from the SPLM. The breakaway faction, based in Nasir until 1995 and then in Waat and Ayod, was called the SPLM/A-Nasir faction from 1991 to 1993. The Bul Nuer Anyanya 2 militia at Mayom under Paulino Matip and the Lou Nuer Anyanya 2 militia at Doleib Hill under Yohannes Yual declared for Riek. Later these forces become part of the government-sponsored SSDF militia.

The civil war ended in January 2005. Yohannes Yual accepted the Juba Declaration of 8 January 2006, joining the army along with other soldiers under the command of Paulino Matiep. His men are primarily Lou Nuer, now in the 8th Division's command in Jonglei state. He is a Major General and has been deputy commander of the 4th Division in Duar, Upper Nile State.

A group called the South Sudan United Democratic Alliance alleged that on 12 April 2006, Lou Nuer (Janai/Gatliek section) SPLA forces under Johannes Yoal Bath launched a revenge attack on Ulang and killed more than 30 people, including both civilians and soldiers. The attack was said to be in retaliation for cattle raids in Nyayin, on the East Bank of the Sobat River, made by combined forces of the SPLA and Jikany Nuer under Commander George Athor Deng. Johannes Yoal Bath had been involved in an attack on Nasir in May 1994.
