= Block 5A, South Sudan =

Petroleum concession of South Sudan

Block 5A
- Oil concessions in Sudan & South Sudan as of 2004. Block 5A in the center of the fields.

- Location within South Sudan
- Country: South Sudan
- Region: Unity State
- Block: 5A
- Offshore/onshore: Onshore
- Coordinates: 8.743947°N 30.140401°E
- Operators: Petronas, ONGC Videsh, Nilepet

Field history
- Discovery: .

Production
- Producing formations: .

Block 5A is an oil concession in South Sudan. After oil field development began during the Second Sudanese Civil War, Block 5A was the scene of extensive fighting as rival militias struggled for control. Out of an original population of 240,000, an estimated 12,000 were killed or died of starvation and 160,000 were displaced by force. Production started in 2006. There is evidence that the environmentally sensitive marshlands beside the Nile are becoming polluted.

== Location ==
The Block 5A concession covers the central part of Unity State on the west of the White Nile, extending west into Warrap State and East into Jonglei State to the east of the Nile. Block 5A is part of a huge, fertile floodplain fed by rivers from the Congo, Uganda, Kenya and Ethiopia. In the dry season the land becomes parched. Pastoralists move their herds from one area to another in search of grazing, usually staying close to a river or permanent wetland. In the wet season, the low-lying lands are covered in flood water, and the herders move to higher ground. Block 5A is populated by Nuer people of the Bul, Leek, Jagei, Western Jikany and Dok sections. The town of Leer, in Dok Nuer territory, is in a key position in the block. On the east of the Nile the southern part of Zeraf island lies in Block 5a, populated mostly by Thiang Nuer.

Geologically, Block 5A is located in the Muglad Basin, which extends from South Sudan north into Sudan and is rich in oil deposits. The Tharjiath field in Block 5A has an area of 54 square kilometres (21 sq mi). Reserves at the Tharjiath field are said to be 250 million barrels. Mala field was expected to start production with 10,000 bpd in 2007 which would go up to 20,000 bpd by 2008. Mala was thought to have 44 million barrels of reserves. Oil has also been found in Jarayan field.

== Struggle for control ==
Sudan was in a state of civil war for most of the years following independence in 1956, apart from a temporary respite between 1972 and 1983. After hostilities resumed, the Sudan People's Liberation Movement/Army (SPLM/A) captured Leer from the government in March 1986, and the town became a stronghold of the rebel commander Riek Machar, who had been born there. In August 1991 Riek Machar broke away from John Garang's mainstream branch of the SPLM/A. Machar's breakaway faction was called the SPLM/A-Nasir faction from 1991 to 1993, and then the South Sudan Independence Army (SSIA) from 1994 to 1997. In 1996 Riek signed a Political Charter and in 1997 the Khartoum Peace Agreement with the government. Riek was made commander in chief of the South Sudan Defense Force (SSDF), which included most of the ex-rebels who had signed the Khartoum agreement. His forces controlled Block 5A.

The swampy and inaccessible region had no strategic value to the Khartoum government before the approach of the pipeline that was built from Port Sudan on the Red Sea to Heglig, not far to the north. The 1,540 kilometres (960 mi) underground pipeline opened in 1999. In 1998, oil exploration began to ramp up in the Block 5A concession area, and Paulino Matiep's South Sudan Unity Movement (SSUM) militia began pushing civilians out. There was growing tension between Riek Machar's SSDF and Paulino Matip's SSUM. Both groups wanted the rewards from providing security to the oil companies. In 1998–1999, Paulino's fighters and government troops clashed several times with Riek's forces in a struggle for control of the Unity state oilfields. Peter Gadet led Paulino Matiep's militia as they marauded through Block 5A in early 1999. His fighters forced Tito Biel, a high-ranking SSDF commander, to evacuate Leer.

By April 1999 Tito Biel's SSDF forces in Western Upper Nile were cooperating with the Sudan People's Liberation Army (SPLA) forces in Bahr el Ghazal, who were supplying arms. On arrival in Yirol early in May 1999 Tito formally declared that he had switched to the SPLA, along with his officers and men. In September 1999 Peter Gadet also mutinied, going over to the SPLA. On 29 September 1999 Gadet shelled Paulino's base of Mayom, causing flight of civilians to Block 5A in the east of the state. For several months after September 1999 Tito coordinated with Gadet in attacking various oil-related targets in Unity State.

With the end of the civil war in January 2005 the fighting died down. However, security problems continue. After the April 2010 elections, Colonel Gatluak Gai of Koch County in Block 5A was dissatisfied with the results and rebelled. He eventually made peace with the SPLA in July 2011, but was killed three days later. On 11 April 2011 Gatluak Gai's son-in-law, Major General Peter Gadet, now of the "South Sudan Liberation Army", published the "Mayom Declaration". He denounced government by the "current corrupt gangs in Juba" and called for the government of Southern Sudan to be replaced by a national broad-base transitional government. Gadet began an assault on the SPLA in Unity state, leaving at least 45 people dead. According to the military, 20 of the victims were southern army soldiers.

== Oil field development and production ==
The Chevron Corporation prospected for oil in Block 5A, and in 1982 reportedly found oil about fours hours walk northwest of Koch. However, Chevron stopped oil exploration after three of their expatriate oil workers were killed by rebels in February 1984.

After the resumption of exploration and development, on 6 February 1997 the Sudanese Government granted the block 5A concession to a consortium of Lundin Oil of Sweden, OMV of Austria, Petronas of Malaysia and Sudapet of Sudan. Lundin's 40.375% stake was held by their Canadian subsidiary International Petroleum Corporation (IPC). OMV agreed to purchase their 27.5% interest in the Block 5A project on 3 June 1997. Petronas already had a pending assignment of a 30% interest. In 2002, Lundin and Talisman Energy swapped some of their assets, but the Lundin family kept control of their block 5A assets. Block 5A was the main asset of Lundin Oil's successor Lundin Petroleum between 2001 and 2003.

In 1998 the consortium established a drilling site at Ryer, in Jagei Nuer territory, near the port of Thar Jath on the Nile. In 1998 they built an unpaved road from Bentiu to the north via Duar and Guk to Ryer and Thar Jath. They gave little work to the local people, but brought in hundreds of Arab and Chinese laborers. The consortium undertook seismic tests, and by October 2000 had acquired over 1,485 kilometres (923 mi) of data. The first exploration well at the Thar Jath field was spudded on 7 April 1999, expected to reach the Cretaceous Bentiu and Darfur sandstones at a depth of around 3,200 metres (10,500 ft) in four to six weeks.

In May 2000, Lundin suspended operations after rebels attacked the Thar Jath rig and killed three government employees. They resumed in March 2001 after the local population had been forcibly removed, but halted once more in January 2002. According to a Lundin report: "... in view of increasing instability in the area, to ensure maximum security for its personnel and operations, the Consortium decided to suspend seismic and drilling activities on Block 5A as a precautionary measure". In March 2003, Lundin said there had been "positive developments in the peace process and the improved conditions in its concession area" and said that it was planning to undertake infrastructure work "as a first step towards an eventual recommencement of activities". In June 2003 Lundin Petroleum completed sale its working interest in Block 5A to Petronas Carigali for US$142.5 million. In August 2003 ONGC Videsh (OVL) of India was given approval to acquire the 26.125% stake owned by OMV in Block 5A. On 2 September 2003 OVL bought OMV's stake in Blocks 5a and 5B for $135 million.

In 2006 White Nile (5B) Petroleum Operating Co started production at the Thar Jath field in Block 5A on behalf of the Contractors (Petronas, ONGC and Sudapet). The company was jointly owned by Petronas of Malaysia (50%) and Sudapet of Sudan (50%). The initial rate of production was 40,000 bbl/day, expected to rise to 54,000 bbl/day by 2009 and then to decline to 39,000 bbl/day in 2011. Crude oil from the field is treated at a new central processing facility, then transported via a new 172-kilometer pipeline to a pump station in Heglig owned and operated by Greater Nile Petroleum Operating Company (GNPOC). From there it is carried by GNPOC's 1,542 kilometres (958 mi) pipeline to Port Sudan on the Red Sea.

A 2005 estimate of total development effort for Thar Jath field was US$311 million. Assuming a Brent price of US$25 per barrel, that would give an Internal Rate of Return of just over 22%.

== Human impact ==
Unlike other oilfields in Sudan, there was no forcible displacement of the civilian population until about 1998, when the consortium led by Lundin Oil started exploration. At that time a government-supported Nuer militia under Major General Paulino Matiep began attacking communities in Block 5A, including Leer. Residents fled to the marshes, where many died of malaria. The Khartoum government wanted to clear all civilians away from the oil facilities, roads and pipeline. Riek Machar's less violent approach was rejected.

In the region around the Ryer/Tharjiath headquarters, the population was forced to leave with little notice in 1998, taking only their cattle. Their houses were destroyed. Between June 1997 and November 1998 fighting between factions in the Nhialdiu area caused about 70% of the population to flee to Bentiu and Mankien. In early 1998 villages around Nhialdiu were looted and destroyed. The health center in Nhialdiu was destroyed. In May 1998 Oxfam began an emergency program to assist 25,000 people in Unity State displaced through insecurity. In June 1998 Duar town was attacked. The Médecins Sans Frontières compound was burned and destroyed, as were the school and the community offices. Paulino's forces raided cattle camps, killing the animals for food. Many of the population fled, some to islands in the Nile where they felt they would be safe. Paulino's forces raided the area around Koch three times in 1998, destroying chapels, clinics, schools and government buildings. Again, those who could escape did so.

Sudanese government troop arrived near Leer in April 1998, but SSDF forces kept them from entering the town. In June, July and August Paulino Matiep's forces attacked Leer, looting and destroying houses and buildings such as the hospital, NGO compounds and churches. After the attacks, the WFP said that Leer had become a ghost town. According to a WFP representative: "Over the past months thousands of people have fled without food or belongings. They've been forced to hide for days in the surrounding swamps and outlying villages, living in constant fear and surviving on just water lilies [a wild food] and fish. Their own villages have been burned down and their grain stores have been looted". The United Nations Office for the Coordination of Humanitarian Affairs defined Unity State as being an area of acute emergency, the worst possible classification.

A major government operation began in block 5A in early 2002 after a Lundin helicopter had been shot down. Civilians along the oil road were the main target, and again there were many casualties and many were forced to flee. Despite a cease-fire agreement, in April 2003 the government opened another offensive in Block 5A. Soon after, Lundin sold its interest in the concession. A study of Landsat data between 1999 and 2004 showed major shifts in land use that closely corresponded to reports of fighting in the block. Between 1999 and 2002 most farming activity stopped in the bands that extended 10 kilometres (6.2 mi) on each side of the newly built oil roads. Traditional farming areas were abandoned and there was a gradual drift of farming activity towards the south and west. By 2002 there was no sign of any farming activity around Nhialdiu, where a series of village attacks had been reported for the last three years.

Reports of attacks by government forces in the period from January to April 2002 in Western Upper Nile (Unity State) said Antonov bombers, helicopter gunships, horsemen and Government of Sudan ground forces and militia were involved. Many civilians were killed. A report published by the International Crisis Group on 10 February 2003 described a renewed push to clear the road south from Bentiu to the port of Adok on the Nile. It said "The offensive from late December until the beginning of February was an extension of the government's long-time strategy of depopulating oilrich areas through indiscriminate attacks on civilians in order to clear the way for further development of infrastructure. Eyewitness accounts confirm that the tactics included the abduction of women and children, gang rapes, ground assaults supported by helicopter gunships, destruction of humanitarian relief sites, and burning of villages.

== Environmental impact ==
Examination of Landsat images in 2006 showed that the all-weather roads built to access the oil fields have disrupted the drainage patterns of the marshes. A blockage more than 8 kilometres (5.0 mi) was first seen in 2003 to the north of the Thar Jath oil field. Given that the field is just 5 kilometres (3.1 mi) from the Nile and that there is a risk of oil contamination, this is a serious concern. On 8 November 2004 a thick black cloud with a 13 km black fane was visible in the Thar Jath oil field, possibly indicating a blowout and resultant oil spill.

In March 2008 there were reports that children in Koch had died from drinking contaminated water. Local officials said that over 1,000 people were suffering from unknown illnesses. Large amounts of saline water are injected into the sub-surface around the oil reservoirs to maintain oil pressure, and this can cause health problems if people drink the water. Witnesses also said that toxic waste was being dumped into pits in the dried swamp, which would flood into the marshes in the rainy season. In November 2009 the German NGO Sign of Hope reported that in the village of Rier, close to the Thar Jath Central Processing Facility, there were critical levels of salts and contaminants such as cyanides, lead, nickel, cadmium and arsenic. This water can cause serious health problems. The pollution was also affecting the Sudd wetlands, deemed to be of international importance under the Ramsar convention.

== Controversy ==
A report by Human Rights Watch published in 2003 claimed that Lundin Oil and other oil companies had deliberately ignored the violent methods the Sudanese government had used to clear land for the companies' activities. The report said "Human Rights Watch believes that the companies in the two oil consortiums during the 1998-2002 period covered in this report, Talisman (Blocks 1, 2 and 4) and Lundin Petroleum (Block 5A), and their partners CNPC, Petronas and OMV, have benefitted from the government's continued abuses of human rights".

There was an outcry in Sweden, and Lundin sold its stake to Petronas. In their 2006 Annual Report, Lundin emphasises that they paid strict attention to international norms related to human rights, and that they implemented a Community Development and Humanitarian Assistance Program to assist local communities in obtaining water supply, health care and education. Talisman Energy, a Canadian company, had already been subject to a critical report prepared for the Canadian government in 2000, although it denied knowing of any human rights abuses. In October 2002, Talisman announced that it was selling its interests in Sudan to ONGC Videsh. The Talisman President said "Shareholders have told me they were tired of continually having to monitor and analyse events relating to Sudan". OMV eventually closed the deal to sell its stake to ONGC in May 2004, backdated to 1 January 2003.

In June 2010, a Swedish public prosecutor said an inquiry was being opened into whether any of Lundin's Swedish employees broke the law. The investigation was triggered by an 8 June 2010 report published by the European Coalition on Oil in the Sudan, an NGO based in the Netherlands. The report claims that Lundin's decision to explore and then extract oil from Block 5A started the war for control of the area. The report asserts that Lundin contributed material used in the war and cooperated with the forces responsible for many of the crimes. Lundin denied the allegations. The investigation was sensitive because Carl Bildt, Swedish Foreign Minister, was a board member during the years when the alleged abuse occurred. OMV, which is 31% owned by the Austrian government, was also implicated by the report.

=== Legal proceedings ===
The inquiry culminated in criminal charges being brought against two former Lundin executives in November 2021. Company chairman Ian Lundin and board member Alexander Schneiter were charged with aiding and abetting war crimes committed during the seizure of Block 5A. Their trial opened on September 4, 2023, and will last until February 2026.

== Impact of secession of South Sudan ==
Petronas Carigali Nile, ONGC Videsh Ltd and Nile Petroleum Corporation (also known as Nilepet, the national oil company of South Sudan) signed a Transition Agreement on January 13, 2012, with the Government of Republic of South Sudan for the continuation of its right for petroleum exploration and exploitation in Block 5A. The partners of Block 5A have incorporated a new operating company Sudd Petroleum Operating Company (SPOC) registered in Mauritius on March 7, 2012. The block is now jointly operated by all partners.
