= Kerubino Kuanyin Bol =

South Sudanese revolutionary (1948–1999)

- Born: 1948 Twic County, Bahr al Ghazal, Anglo-Egyptian Sudan
- Died: 9 September 1999 (aged 50–51)
- Allegiance: Anyanya (1960s–1972); Sudanese Armed Forces (1972–1983) SPLA (1983–1987; 1995–1999); SPLA-Nasir (1993–1995)
- Conflicts: First Sudanese Civil War; Second Sudanese Civil War

Kerubino Kuanyin Bol (1948 – 9 September 1999) was a Sudanese rebel leader who was one of the founders of the Sudan People's Liberation Movement (SPLM) and one of the leaders of the Sudan People's Liberation Army (SPLA) during the Second Sudanese Civil War and was said to have fired the first shot in the war.

Bol was arrested by the SPLA in 1987 after being accused of trying to overthrow John Garang. In 1993, after being released, Bol's forces joined the SPLA splinter group SPLA-Nasir led by Riek Machar. He was shot and killed in 1999 under unclear circumstances.

== Biography ==
=== Early life ===
Bol was born in 1948 to Dinka parents in Twic County, Bahr al Ghazal province in the west of present-day South Sudan. He was educated at a Roman Catholic mission primary school, and went on to intermediate studies. In the 1960s, Bol joined the Anyanya separatist rebel group during the First Sudanese Civil War and later joined the Sudanese Armed Forces after the civil war ended in 1972.

=== Role in the Second Sudanese Civil War and as an SPLA commander ===
On 16 May 1983, Bol and William Nyuon Bany led a mutiny against the Sudanese government in Bor, in southern Sudan, with their forces of the 105th Battalion firing the first bullet that sparked the Second Sudanese Civil War and consequently led to the foundation of the Sudan People's Liberation Army (SPLA). In June 1983, John Garang, a Sudanese Army colonel and future leader of the SPLA, joined the mutiny of the garrison in Bor. Kerubino then nominated Garang as the Commander-in-Chief, made himself second in command, Bany third and Salva Kiir fourth. Bany was also the Chief of Staff, Arok Thon Arok, who was said to be related to Garang, was the fifth senior commander of the Permanent Political Military Office of the SPLA.

In 1986, Bol was deputy commander-in-chief of the SPLA and deputy chairman of the SPLM provisional executive committee. In 1987, he led a successful attack on several towns in Blue Nile province to the north of South Sudan. In June of that year, Bol was accused of plotting a coup against Garang and was jailed for the next six years.

=== SSIM commander ===
In August 1991 Riek Machar, Lam Akol and Gordon Kong announced that Garang had been ejected from the SPLM. They formed a rival militia called the SPLA-Nasir, after their base in the town of Nasir.

On 5 April 1993, at a press conference in Nairobi, three rebel factions – including SPLA-Nasir (led by Lam Akol and joined by Machar and Bany) – announced a coalition, to be called "Sudanese People's Liberation Army-United", known as SPLA-United. It included a number of former Garang officials and other southerners. Bol's Dinka forces made an important addition to the formerly Nuer-dominated SPLA-Nasir. Bol became deputy Commander in Chief. Although seeking independence for southern Sudan, the group received covert support from the Government of Sudan as it fought the SPLA between 1991 and 1999 in attacks that became increasingly violent and ethnically motivated.

=== Government ally ===
Early in 1995 Machar dismissed Bol and Bany from his South Sudan Independence Movement (SSIM) on the basis that they had signed military and political agreements with the government of Sudan late in the previous year, and that they had attempted to form a government-supported faction in the SSIM.

The Sudan government tried to make Bol a leader in his home province, but he was not successful in gaining support of the local Dinka, and members of his militia returned to their villages.

In January 1998 Bol's forces briefly seized Wau, the main town in Bahr al Ghazal. From this strong position, he applied to rejoin the SPLA. He was accepted but assigned to a headquarters position rather than a field appointment. In disgust, he returned to the Sudan Government and in 1999 joined the South Sudan United Army, a militia headed by Paulino Matip.

=== Death ===
Later in 1999, Commander Peter Gadet fell out with Paulino Matip. During the struggles that followed, Bol was shot in obscure circumstances on 10 September 1999. He left several wives and more than 20 children.
