= Mankien =

- Town
- Location in South Sudan
- Coordinates: 9.052387°N 29.095359°E
- Country: South Sudan
- Region: Greater Upper Nile
- State: Unity
- County: Mayom County
- Time zone: UTC+2 (CAT)

Mankien (or Mankin) is a community in Unity State in South Sudan. With a key location near the oil fields, the town changed hands more than once during the Second Sudanese Civil War (1983-2005). In April 2011 the town was once again the scene of conflict between militia and government troops.

== Location ==
Mankien is in the Mayom County of Unity State, in the Greater Upper Nile region of South Sudan. It is located southwest of Mayom. Mankien is mainly inhabited by Bul Nuer people. The town lies within the Block 4 oil concession.

== Civil war ==
In March 1998, Major General Paulino Matiep announced the formation of his South Sudan Unity Army (SSUA) based in Mankien, with Bul Nuer boys and men armed by the government. By mid-1998, Unity State was experiencing pre-famine conditions due to the disruption of the civil war. In December 1998 the World Food Programme delivered its first shipment of food for four months to Mankien. In July 1999 SSDN Commander Tito Biel, who had been given ammunition by the SPLA, launched an attack on Paulino Matiep's forces and pushed them back almost to their headquarters in Mankien. This was interpreted as a struggle between different pro-government militias over who would control the oil fields.

In September 1999 Commander Peter Gatdet defected from the government and took control of Mankien and its supplies of arms and ammunition. There were reports that the government of Sudan was bombing Mankien towards the end of that month. Civilians were killed or injured, including some who had fled from Mayom. The government refused aid workers flight access to the town, indicating that they had lost control. Renewed bombings were reported in March 2000. In April 2000 the town was controlled still by Peter Gatdet. Khartoum launched an offensive of several hundred Baggara horsemen supported by artillery, gunships and Antonovs. Peter Gadet managed to repel the government forces.

In January 2002 Mankien was controlled by the Sudan People's Liberation Army (SPLA) and had a large population of displaced people. The government began an offensive of high-altitude bombing from Antonov's, causing random casualties to the civilians. Before dawn on 27 January 2002 government troops and militias attacked the town, supported by helicopter gunships. There were many casualties and the town was destroyed. In May 2002 the SPLA lost Mankien to the Paulino Matiep's militia.

== Later events ==
After the civil war, a team found that 4% of people around Mankien were blind, and almost 8% more had poor vision, mainly due to untreated diseases such as Trachoma. In April 2011 the town was briefly occupied by forces loyal to the renegade general Peter Gadet before being re-taken by troops of the SPLA. A spokesman for Peter Gadet said the fight was only with the SPLA, and no civilians would be harmed. After further fighting in May 2011, when Peter's forces attacked Mankien from his home village of Ruadnyibol, the Mayom county commissioner said that about 7,800 huts had been burned.

While reporting on mine clearance operations around Mankien, the project manager for Norwegian People's Aid said "Unity State remains one of the most contaminated states in South Sudan, with a high number of Dangerous Areas, several minefields and a high number of abandoned ordnance contaminating huge areas of land".
