= Doleib Hill =

- Village
- Location in South Sudan
- Coordinates: 9.35972°N 31.60083°E
- Country: South Sudan
- Region: Greater Upper Nile
- State: Upper Nile
- County: Panykang County
- Time zone: UTC+2 (CAT)

Doleib Hill was a mission station established by the American Inland Mission in southern Sudan, located approximately 10 miles (16 km) south of the city of Malakal, on the northern bank of the Sobat River, then in the former Upper Nile province of Sudan, the present-day Panykang County of Upper Nile state, in the Greater Upper Nile region of South Sudan.

== Early years ==
Doleib Hill was established during the Anglo-Egyptian Sudan condominium period, in the early part of the 20th century, and developed into an important educational and religious center among the Shilluk people of the region. The Reverend J. Alfred Heasty lived at Doleib Hill from 1921 and became an expert on the local Shulla people and their language.

The Shilluk (Shulla) were primarily herdsmen rather than farmers, measuring their wealth and social standing in cattle. They felt it was wrong to kill a cow, but would eat one that had died. The Shulla also hunted and fished and foraged for wild edible plants.

== Civil wars ==
During the First Sudanese Civil War (1955-1972) the school was forcibly closed by government forces. The Government of Sudan targeted the Christianized-Westernized educated elite, treating them as rebels. In July 1965 the headmaster of the girls' schools at Doleib Hill was one of the first to be tortured and then killed.

The school was reopened after the Addis Ababa peace accord of 1972. The school was subsequently forced to close for a second time after the outbreak of the Second Sudanese Civil War (1983-2005).

The school buildings were occupied as a Sudanese government garrison in 1983. In late 1986 and early 1987 rebel Anyanya-2 forces attacked Shilluk villages near Doleib Hill and Taufikia several times. Possibly as many as 600 civilians were killed.

In 1991 the Lou Nuer Anyanya-2 militia was based near Doleib Hill under Yohannes Yual when it declared for Riek Machar's breakaway SPLA-Nasir.

In 1995 Riek Machar granted an amnesty to Commander Gordon Kong Banypiny, who had been convicted for using his troops in an ethnically motivated attack on Nasir, held by a different section of Nuer within the SSIA command. After trying to raise support in the Waat region, Gordon Kong fled to Doleib Hill, which was held by a government militia commanded by Mabur Dhol, a former Anyana soldier. He went on from there to Malakak where he obtained arms from the government.

Since 2011 Doleib Hill has been in the northern region of the new country of South Sudan, in the Upper Nile state.
