= Tito Biel =

South Sudanese revolutionary

Tito Biel Chuor (or Chol, Chor) was a high-ranking commander in the South Sudan Defense Forces (SSDF) during the Second Sudanese Civil War (1983–2005).

Tito Biel, of the Dok section of the Nuer people, was originally in the Sudan People's Liberation Army (SPLA), but joined Riek Machar's breakaway faction in 1991. He followed Riek Machar when he became reconciled with the Sudan government in 1997, joining the SSDF.

Major General Tito Biel led SSDF forces in 1998/1999 in clashes with Sudan Armed Forces (SAF) troops and militia under Major General Paulino Matiep. By April 1999 Tito Biel's SSDF forces in Western Upper Nile were cooperating with the Sudan People's Liberation Army (SPLA) forces in Bahr el Ghazal, who were supplying arms. Tito was pushed out of Leer by Paulino's forces, and on arrival in Yirol early in May 1999 he formally declared that he had switched to the SPLA, along with his officers and men. For several months after September 1999 he coordinated with Commander Peter Gadet in attacking various oil-related targets in Unity State. Gadet had also rebelled from the SSDF after fighting Tito earlier in the year for control of Block 5A.

In November 1999 Biel, Gadet and other Nuer commanders formed the Upper Nile Provisional United Military Command Council (UMCC) to coordinate anti-government forces in the state. They were not satisfied with Riek Machar for cooperating with the government despite the fact that the government had not honored the Khartoum peace agreement and had not handed over control of the oil fields to the Nuer militias. Riek Machar resigned from the government at the end of the year and in February 2000 formed the Sudan People's Defense Forces/Democratic Front (SPDF). For a while the UMCC and SPDF cooperated, but the arrangement broke down as the government supplied Machar with arms and ammunition to settle grievances with the SPLA/Gadet troop.

Later in 2000 Tito Biel joined Riek Machar's SPDF. He spent several months after March 2000 in Nairobi with Riek Machar and other leaders. In early 2001 Tito Biel returned to Eastern Upper Nile with Riek Machar where they tried to drum up support for the SPDF militia. In early February 2002, resentful that he had not been consulted on Riek Machar's deal with John Garang to rejoin the SPLA, Tito Biel rejoined the Sudan government. Later he was joined by Peter Gadet.
