= Gordon Kong Chuol =

South Sudanese revolutionary

- Born: Tergol, Illubabor Province, Ethiopian Empire (now Gambela Region, Ethiopia)
- Military career
- Allegiance: Anyanya II late 1970s–1988); SPLA (1988–1991); SPLA-Nasir (1991–1997); SSDF (1997–1999); Sudan (1999–2001); SSDF (2001–2006); Nasir Peace Force (since 2006)
- Service years: 1970s – present
- Conflicts: First Sudanese Civil War; Second Sudanese Civil War

Gordon Kong Chuol is a former militia commander in South Sudan, who fought for the Sudan People's Liberation Army (SPLA) and later for the forces led by Riek Machar during the Second Sudanese Civil War.

== Independence fighter ==
Gordon Kong Chuol belongs to the Jikany Nuer section of the Nuer people and comes from Ulang County, Upper Nile State. Chuol was born in the Ethiopian village Tergol. He joined the Anyanya rebel group in the late 1970s. He became a militia leader of Thoorjikany Forces, and a Major-General in the Anyanya II in 1988. As a leader of the separatist Anyanya II movement he fought against the SPLA from 1983 to 1988. In 1988, he led the reconciliation of most members of Anyanya II with the SPLA. He then became a commander and a member of the SPLM/SPLA Political-Military High Command. In August 1991 Riek Machar, Lam Akol and Chuol announced in the Nasir Declaration that John Garang had been ejected from the SPLM. The breakaway faction, based in Nasir until 1995 and then in Waat and Ayod, was called the SPLA-Nasir faction from 1991 to 1993.

In the first part of 1994, Chuol became involved in a quarrel between Lou Nuer from Waat and Jikany Nuer in Nasir over fishing rights in the Sobat River. As commander of Waat and Nasir, Gordon Kong was ordered by Riek Machar to defend Nasir. Instead Gordon Kong left Nasir and launched an attack on Lou civilians. In response, the Lou called in Kong Banypiny for help, and he led a force of Lou men to Nasir, which they burned. Riek Machar arrested the commanders who had become involved in this fighting between SSIA sections and put them up for trial. Some were sentenced to imprisonment and others to death. Later they were pardoned.

== Government of Sudan militia leader ==
Gordon Kong signed the Khartoum peace agreement with the government in 1997, and was appointed a commander with the South Sudan Defence Forces (SSDF) under Riek Machar. Gordon Kong received separate funding from the Sudan Armed Forces (SAF) and in 1999 defected from Machar's command and became a direct client of the Government of Sudan. His forces reportedly helped push Machar's SSDF forces out of Ler in 1998. On 27 April 2001, the provisional military council of the SSDF was announced, with Major General Paulino Matiep as Commander and Gordon Kong Chuol as Deputy Commander and Commander for Operations.

The civil war ended in January 2005, and the Juba Declaration of 8 January 2006 laid out the basis for unifying rival military forces in South Sudan. Gordon Kong resisted the merger. His core faction, the "Nasir Peace Force" was based in the village of Ketbek, just north of Nasir, with 75-80 fighters as of August 2006 and perhaps 300 reserve forces in the area. His position on the border with Sudan to the north and near to the functioning Adar Yale oilfield was sensitive. Paulino Matiep accepted the agreement, but Gordon Kong proclaimed himself the new SSDF Commander-in-Chief, saying that his forces still supported the Sudan Government. A newspaper report speculated that while Matiep was looking at political opportunities in the Government of South Sudan, Gordon Kong was looking at potential gains from control of the oil-rich Bentiu area.
