= Thar Jath =

- Location in South Sudan
- Coordinates: 8.46667°N 30.31667°E
- Country: South Sudan
- State: Unity State
- County: Koch County
- Time zone: UTC+2 (CAT)

Thar Jath is a community in Koch County, Unity State, South Sudan.

Thar Jath was chosen as a base by the consortium that developed the Block 5A, South Sudan concession, naming the oil field "Thar Jath" after the town. In 1998, the consortium established a drilling site at Ryer, in Jagei Nuer territory, near the port of Thar Jath on the Nile. In 1998, they built an unpaved road from Bentiu to the north, via Duar and Guk, to Ryer and Thar Jath.
