= SPLA =

SPLA may refer to:

- Sahrawi People's Liberation Army, the army of the Sahrawi Arab Democratic Republic, previously the armed branch of the Polisario Front
- Socialist Propaganda League of America, former group within the ranks of the Socialist Party of America, 1915–1919
- South Sudan People's Defense Forces, formerly Sudan People's Liberation Army
  - SPLA-Nasir and SPLA-United, a Sudanese breakaway faction formed in 1991
- Services Provider License Agreement, created by Microsoft to allow service providers to host software services for their customers
- SHARE Program Library Agency, a repository of contributed programs for IBM computers.

== See also ==
- Spla/ryanodine receptor domain and socs box containing 3, a protein encoded by the SPSB3 gene
