= Dinka–Nuer conflict =

Ethnic conflict in South Sudan

The Dinka and Nuer are the two largest ethnic groups in South Sudan. Conflict over pastures and cattle raids has been happening between these two ethnic groups as they battle for grazing their animals. In 1983, there was a civil war between Southern and Northern Sudan, and Southern Sudan was forced into the lower region, where there were fewer resources. These actions created conflict between the Dinka and Nuer people in South Sudan. Another cause is difference in religion.

== Civil war period ==
During the Second Sudanese Civil War (1983–2005), divisions within the southern rebel movement, the SPLM/A, reflected ethnic and political fractures. In 1991, a split occurred when Nuer commander Riek Machar led a breakaway faction, the SPLA-Nasir, in opposition to the leadership of Dinka leader John Garang. The division led to violent clashes between Dinka and Nuer communities, including the 1991 Bor massacre, in which hundreds of Dinka civilians were killed.

== See also ==
- Ethnic violence in South Sudan
- Sudanese nomadic conflicts
