= Military ranks of South Sudan =

The Military ranks of South Sudan are the military insignia used by the South Sudan People's Defence Forces.

== Commissioned officer ranks ==
The rank insignia of commissioned officers.

| Rank group | General / flag officers | | | | | Senior officers | | | Junior officers |
|---|---|---|---|---|---|---|---|---|---|---|---|
| South Sudan Army |
| South Sudan Army | Field marshal | General | Lieutenant general | Major general | Brigadier | Colonel | Lieutenant colonel | Major | Captain | First lieutenant | Second lieutenant |
| South Sudan Air Force |
| South Sudan Air Force | Air marshal | General | Lieutenant general | Major general | Brigadier general | Colonel | Lieutenant colonel | Major | Captain | First lieutenant | Second lieutenant |
| Rank group | General / flag officers | | | | | Senior officers | | | Junior officers |

== Other ranks ==
The rank insignia of non-commissioned officers and enlisted personnel.

| Rank group | Senior NCOs | | | Junior NCOs | | Enlisted |
|---|---|---|---|---|---|---|
| South Sudan Army |
| South Sudan Army | Regimental sergeant major | Sergeant major | Sergeant | Corporal | Lance corporal | Private |
| South Sudan Air Force |
| South Sudan Air Force | Regimental sergeant major | Sergeant major | Sergeant | Corporal | Lance corporal | Private |
| Rank group | Senior NCOs | | | Junior NCOs | | Enlisted |
