= Juba Declaration of 8 January 2006 =

The Juba Declaration of 8 January 2006, formally the Juba Declaration on Unity and Integration between the Sudan People’s Liberation Army (SPLA) And the South Sudan Defence Forces (SSDF) 8 January 2006, laid out the basis for unifying rival military forces in South Sudan following the end of the Second Sudanese Civil War in January 2005.

== Background ==
The Comprehensive Peace Agreement of 9 January 2005 ended hostilities between the Sudan People's Liberation Army (SPLA) and the Sudan Armed Forces (SAF), and laid the framework for conduct of a referendum that could eventually lead to independence for South Sudan. However, it left unresolved the issue of what would happen to the smaller armed groups, and in particular the South Sudan Defence Forces (SSDF). The SSDF had provided security for SAF garrisons and for oilfields in the north of South Sudan, and in return had been provided with arms and ammunition by the SAF, although the SSDF remained deeply suspicious of the Khartoum-based government.

== Agreement ==
SPLA leader John Garang failed in his approach of trying to defeat the SSDF militarily or to win over SSDF leaders to the SPLA. Garang died on 30 July 2005 in an air crash. His successor, Salva Kiir, took a fresh approach that emphasized détente, unity and reconciliation. This defused tension and led to the successful agreement on the declaration. Most SSDF soldiers joined the SPLA, and SSDF chief of staff Major General Paulino Matieb became deputy commander of the SPLA under Salva Kiir as commander. More than 50,000 of Matip's forces were integrated into the SPLA and other organized forces, but he retained some former SSDF soldiers as a personal bodyguard.

== Later tensions ==
Tension remained high. In October 2006 Matiep aired accusations that his troops were being sidelined in the appointments being made within the SPLA. Shortly after the Juba declaration was signed, Brigadier Gordon Kong proclaimed himself the new SSDF Commander-in-Chief, saying that his forces still supported the Sudan Government. A newspaper report speculated that while Matiep was looking at political opportunities in the Government of South Sudan, Kong was looking at potential gains from control of the oil-rich Bentiu area. Some former SSDF soldiers became dissatisfied later. General Peter Gadet, who joined the SPLA after Juba Declaration, said that he was marginalized and that the army was dominated by tribal nepotism. In April 2011 Gadet emerged as leader of the South Sudan Liberation Army (SSLA), a new militia demanding a more broadly-based government.
