= Paulino Matip Nhial =

South Sudanese revolutionary and politician (1942 - 2012)

- Born: 1942; Ngop, Anglo-Egyptian Sudan (now South Sudan)
- Died: 22 August 2012 (aged 69–70); Mayo Clinic, Nairobi, Kenya
- Military career
- Allegiance: Anyanya II (1976–1991); SPLA-Nasir (1991–1997); SSDF (1997–2006); SPLA (2006–2012)
- Service years: 1976 – 2012
- Conflicts: First Sudanese Civil War; Second Sudanese Civil War

Paulino Matip Nhial (1942 – 22 August 2012), or Matiep Nhial, was a military leader and politician in South Sudan.

== Early career ==
Paulino belonged to the Bul section of the Nuer people. He joined the Anyanya separatist force during the First Sudanese Civil War (1955–1972), but after the peace agreement of 1972 he did not join the Sudanese army. In 1975 he again became a rebel in Bilpam and moved to Ethiopia. The Second Sudanese Civil War started in 1983, and was to continue until 2005. Paulino became a member of Anyanya II, and in 1985 returned to Unity State (Western Upper Nile), armed and supported by the government. He was opposed to the Sudan People's Liberation Army (SPLA) which had attacked Ananya II in 1983. Fighting with Brigadier Omar al-Bashir, then an army officer but soon to lead a coup and become president of Sudan, early in 1989 he recaptured Mayom in Unity State from the SPLA. In 1991, Paulino joined Riek Machar’s faction.

Paulino's Bul Nuer territory around Mankien and Mayom in Unity state is close to both Kordofan and Bahr al-Ghazal and well situated for trade. He established an autonomous trading empire dealing in locally grown sorghum and in cattle looted from the Dinka people or purchased in the cattle market at Ler. After the Nasir faction led by Riek Machar split from the SPLA mainstream, Paulino nominally joined this faction but in practice retained his independence of action. His headquarters grew in importance as a centre for trade between the Arabs and Western Nuer, exchanging manufactured goods for cattle.

== SSDF leader ==
After signature of the Khartoum Peace Agreement of 1997, Paulino's forces were technically incorporated into the South Sudan Defense Forces (SSDF). In September 1997 he tried unsuccessfully to become governor of Unity State. The government recognized his militia, the South Sudan Unity Movement/Army (SSUM/A), in March 1998. The government supplied arms and ammunition and named Paulino a Major General in the Sudan Armed Forces. Riek's opposition to his governorship bid had caused a rupture between the two, and in July 1998 Paulino's troops took and sacked Ler, Riek's former base. Although the SSUM became fragmented, with fighting between units led by rival commanders, it was the most powerful militia of people from the south that opposed the SPLA in the war.

Between 1998 and 2003 Paulino fought on the government side, forcibly removing civilians from the Block 5A oil concession area, and assisting in clearances from other oil blocks. In 1998–1999, Paulino's fighters and government troops clashed with Riek Machar's SSDF forces in a struggle for control of the Unity state oilfields. Paulino's fighters forced Tito Biel, a high-ranking SSDF commander, to evacuate Leer early in 1999. Tito Biel later declared that he had gone over to the SPLA. Riek himself resigned from the government and SSDF in 2000, forming a separate militia named the Sudan People's Democratic Forces, and in 2002 agree to merge this force with the SPLA.

As of April 2004 Paulino was chief of staff of the SSDF, and had wide-ranging power over the inhabitants of the Bentiu, Mayoum and Mankin areas of Unity State. Despite his title, he had less control over Nuer outside the Bul Nuer area, and even in his home area did not have complete control. Although opposed to the SPLA and receiving help from the government, the SSDF party as opposed to the militia was suspicious of the north and in favor of some measure of independence. In the spring of 2004, SSDF militias in the Shilluk Kingdom burned villages and displaced thousands of people on government orders. The SSDF leaders including Paulino, Gordon Kuang, and Benson Kuany made their disgust with this action clear.

== Postwar career ==
After the war ended in January 2005, the status of the SSDF was not at first clear. On 30 June 2005, Paulino Matip met with John Garang in Nairobi to discuss the composition of the new army and the position of SSDF fighters in this army. In 2006 Paulino signed the Juba Declaration of 8 January 2006 and integrated into the SPLA. He was appointed deputy Commander in Chief of the SPLA. More than 50,000 of Paulino's forces were integrated into the SPLA and other organized forces, but he retained some former SSDF soldiers as a personal bodyguard. However, tension remained high. In October 2006 Paulino aired accusations that his troops were being sidelined in the appointments being made within the SPLA.

In May 2007 Paulino had to dispel rumors that he had died after seeking medical treatment in South Africa. In August 2008 he visited the United States for medical treatment. In May 2009 Paulino was promoted to the rank of 1st lieutenant general while Major General James Hoth Mai was promoted to lieutenant general and appointed the SPLA's chief of staff. In October 2009 it was reported that around 300 of Matip's guards were being airlifted to Juba by the United Nations. A week before there had been a clash between soldiers guarding Matip's residence in Bentiu and another SPLA unit in which one report said ten people died, mainly soldiers. Another report gave the casualties as 15 soldiers and three civilians dead and 31 others injured. According to Riek Machar, now Deputy President of South Sudan, Paulino Matip's house was attacked by heavily armed soldiers supported by tanks. In a public letter, Matip accused the SPLA, its Commander-in-Chief, Salva Kiir and the state governor Taban Deng Gai of being involved in plotting the attack.

In March 2011 a presidential adviser said a plot had been discovered to assassinate Riek Machar, the vice president, Paulino Matip, Thomas Cirilo, Ismail Kony, Augustino Jadalla Wani and Isaac Obuto Mamur. This came during growing tension as independence approached. The Khartoum government was thought to be trying to stir up dissensions among former rivals in the south.
