= Riek Machar =

South Sudanese politician (born 1952)

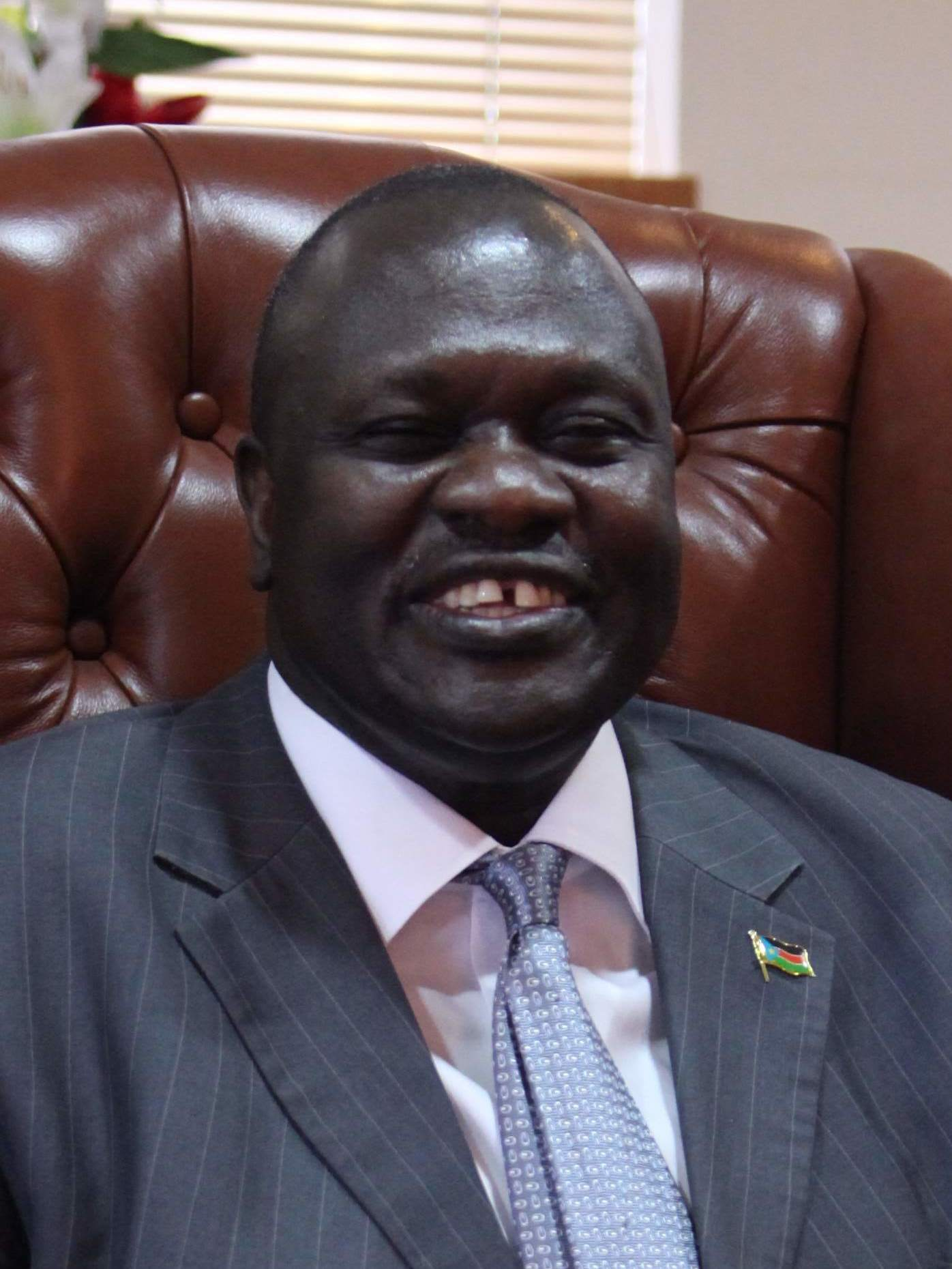
- Machar in 2012

1st & 4th First Vice President of South Sudan
- In office 21 February 2020 (Note: Suspended: 11 September 2025 – 22 September 2026) – 21 September 2026
- President: Salva Kiir
- Preceded by: Taban Deng Gai
- In office 26 April 2016 – 23 July 2016
- President: Salva Kiir
- Preceded by: Position established
- Succeeded by: Taban Deng Gai

1st Vice President of South Sudan
- In office 9 July 2011 – 23 July 2013
- President: Salva Kiir
- Preceded by: Himself (as Vice President of Southern Sudan)
- Succeeded by: James Wani Igga

2nd Vice President of Southern Sudan
- In office 11 August 2005 – 9 July 2011
- President: Salva Kiir
- Preceded by: Salva Kiir
- Succeeded by: Himself (as Vice President of South Sudan)

Personal details
- Born: Riek Machar Teny Dhurgon; 26 November 1952 (age 73) Leer, Upper Nile, Anglo-Egyptian Sudan (now South Sudan)
- Party: Sudan People's Liberation Movement-in-Opposition
- Other political affiliations: Sudan People's Liberation Movement-in-Opposition
- Spouse(s): Emma McCune (m. 1991; died 1993) Angelina Teny
- Children: 4
- Education: University of Khartoum; University of Bradford
- Nickname: SENNAR

Military service
- Allegiance: SPLA, SPLA-Nasir, SPLA-IO
- Battles/wars: Second Sudanese Civil War; South Sudanese Civil War

Riek Machar Teny Dhurgon (born 26 November 1952) is a South Sudanese politician who served as the vice president of South Sudan on two occasions, first for a short time in 2016, and from 2020 to 2026.

A member of the Nuer ethnic group, Machar earned degrees in engineering from Khartoum University and the University of Bradford. In 1984, he joined the Sudanese People's Liberation Army/Movement (SPLA/M) rebel group fighting for southern independence during the Second Sudanese Civil War.

Due to a rift with SPLA/M leader John Garang, Machar was ejected from the group in 1991, and founded the SPLA-Nasir splinter group. Later that year, Machar was involved in the Bor massacre, in which his forces took part in the massacre of at least 2,000 Dinka civilians. Over the next several years, Machar led several different rebel groups and militias, including the SPLA-United, the South Sudan Independence Movement/Army (SSIM/A), the South Sudan Defence Forces (SSDF) and the Sudan People's Defense Forces/Democratic Front (SPDF), before reuniting with Garang and the SPLA/M in 2002.

Following the end of the Second Sudanese Civil War in 2005, Machar was made Vice President of the Southern Sudan Autonomous Region with Garang's successor Salva Kiir as president. Following the South's gaining of independence in 2011, Machar became Vice President of the independent republic of South Sudan with Kiir as President.

In 2025, Machar was charged with treason and murder over an attack on a military base earlier that year. He was suspended from the first vice presidency and brought to trial.

== Political life ==
In February 2020, Machar was re-sworn in as first vice president following a revitalized peace agreement with Salva Kiir, the current President of South Sudan. He is also the head of the rebel faction known as SPLM-IO (Sudan People's Liberation Movement-In Opposition) that was founded in 2014 following the 2013 war outbreak and has been historically in opposition to Kiir. Between April and July 2016 Machar served as the First Vice President of South Sudan. He is designated to be the First Vice President according to the new "revitalized" peace agreement signed in September 2018. Dr. Riek Machar will take up the post of First Vice President when the new unity government is formed, initially in February 2019, but later delayed until February 2020.

Machar obtained a PhD in strategic planning in 1984 and then joined the rebel Sudan People's Liberation Movement/Army (SPLM/A) during the Second Sudanese Civil War (1983–2005). Machar fell out with the SPLM/A leader John Garang in 1991 and formed a splinter group, the SPLM/A-Nasir. In 1997, he made a treaty with the Government of Sudan and became head of the government-backed South Sudan Defense Force (SSDF). In 2000, he left the SSDF and formed a new militia, the Sudan People's Defense Forces/Democratic Front (SPDF), and in 2002 rejoined the SPLA/M as a senior commander. After the death of John Garang in July 2005, Machar became vice-president of the autonomous Southern Sudan. He became vice-president of South Sudan on 9 July 2011 when the country became independent, but was dismissed from office by President Salva Kiir on 23 July 2016. Machar was re-appointed as First Vice-president of South Sudan on 22 February 2020 as part of the Revitalized Transitional Government of National Unity.

== Early career ==
Riek Machar Teny Dhurgon was born in Leer, Unity State on 26 November 1952, the 27th son of the chief of Ayod and Leer. He was brought up as a member of the Presbyterian church. Machar belongs to the Dok section (Dok-Chiengluom) of the Nuer Bentiu people. He trained as an engineer at Khartoum University, and obtained a PhD in Mechanical Engineering from the University of Bradford in 1984.

Machar has been called a tuut dhoali/Doth in English, which may be translated "adult boy", meaning uninitiated and literate. He has tried to transcend tribal divisions, and at one time attempted to ban initiation marks. However, in his struggle with John Garang he exploited ethnic rivalries between the Nuer and Dinka people. Machar married Emma McCune, a British aid worker. She died in a car accident in Nairobi in 1993 at the age of 29, while pregnant. Machar's second wife, Angelina Teny, is one of the leading women politicians in South Sudan. She was state minister of Energy and Mining in the transitional government (2005–2010).

Machar was a rebel leader with the Sudan People's Liberation Army/Movement (SPLM/A) headed by John Garang from 1984 until he fell out with Garang in 1991. As Zonal Commander of Western Upper Nile, in 1986 he entered into an agreement with Baggara chiefs. Machar led forces that attacked and overran Melut in 1989. That year he was able to visit his family, which was based in Britain, for the first time since the civil war started. In 1990 Machar was based at Leer. Later he was appointed SPLA Regional Commander for a region that extended from the Ethiopian border in the east to Renk in the north and to Ayod and Waat in the south.

Machar disagreed with the SPLA leader John Garang over objectives. Where John Garang at first wanted a secular and democratic but united Sudan in which the southerners would have full representation, Machar wanted a fully independent South Sudan. In August 1991 Riek Machar, Lam Akol and Gordon Kong announced that John Garang had been ejected from the SPLM. Kong Chuol is from the Eastern Jikany Nuer and Lam Akol is from the Shilluk people. The breakaway faction, based in Nasir until 1995 and then in Waat and Ayod, was called the SPLM/A-Nasir faction from 1991 to 1993. As part of SPLA-Nasir, he was involved in the Bor massacre, where 2000 mostly civilians were killed in Bor in 1991 while tens of thousands died in the following years from the resulting famine. The Bul Nuer Anyanya-2 militia at Mayom under Paulino Matip and the Lou Nuer Anyanya-2 militia at Doleib Hill under Yohannes Yual declared for Riek.

Kerubino Kuanyin and Faustino Atem Gualdit, Dinkas from Bahr el-Ghazal, had been among the founders of the SPLM but had fallen out with John Garang and had been jailed. They escaped and joined Machar in 1993, with their forces making an important addition to the formerly Nuer-dominated SPLA-Nasir. Kerubino became deputy Commander in Chief. After this addition by forces from other ethnic groups, Riek's movement and force was called the SPLA-United from 1993 to 1994.

In September 1993, President Daniel Arap Moi of Kenya held separate talks with Garang and Riek Machar. In October 1993 the US Congress hosted a meeting between Garang and Machar. The two seemed to agree about various subjects related to a cease fire and reconciliation between the two factions, self-determination and opposition to the Khartoum regime, but Machar disputed Garang's authority and refused to sign a joint declaration. Machar dismissed Lam Akol from the SPLA-United in February 1994. Lam Akol returned to Kodok in the government-held region of Upper Nile state.

From 1994 to 1997 Machar's movement was known as the South Sudan Independence Movement/Army (SSIM/A). Although seeking independence for South Sudan, the group received covert support from the Government of Sudan as it fought the SPLA between 1991 and 1999 in attacks that became increasingly violent and ethnically motivated. Early in 1995 hostilities between the SSIM and SPLA, which had taken several thousands of civilian lives, were temporarily suspended. Machar dismissed Kerubino Kuanyin and Commander William Nyuon Bany from the SSIM on the basis that they had signed military and political agreements with the government of Sudan late in the previous year, and that they had attempted to form a government-supported faction in the SSIM.

During the 1990s Machar skillfully developed support among the eastern Nuer, the Jikany and the Lou, taking advantage of SPLA unpopularity with the Jikany and drawing on prophetic tradition to make his case. In 1996 Machar signed a Political Charter and in 1997 the Khartoum Peace Agreement with the government. Under this agreement he was assistant to Omar el-Bashir, President of Sudan, and President of the Southern States Coordinating Council. He was also made commander in chief of the South Sudan Defense Force (SSDF), which included most of the ex-rebels who had signed the Khartoum agreement.

== Return to SPLM ==
There was growing tension between Riek Machar and Paulino Matip's South Sudan Unity Movement (SSUM), which became engaged in forcibly removing civilians from the Block 5A oil concession area, and assisting in clearances from other oil blocks. In 1998–1999, Matip's fighters and government troops clashed several times with Machar's SSDF forces in a struggle for control of the Unity state oilfields. Matip's fighters forced Tito Biel, a high-ranking SSDF commander, to evacuate Leer early in 1999. Tito Biel later went over to the SPLA.

Riek Machar's failure to prevent the government from forcibly displacing civilians from the oil-producing areas of Unity State turned the Nuer against his leadership. Machar's SSDF began to receive ammunition from the SPLA as of June 1999. In 2000 at a meeting of leaders in Koch he finally resigned from the government of Sudan and created a fresh militia named the Sudan People's Defense Forces/Democratic Front (SPDF). At risk in his own homeland of the Dok Nuer, Riek moved his base of operations to the eastern Jikany area. In January 2002 he signed an agreement with John Garang to merge the SPDF into the SPLA, and was given command of the Dok Nuer within the SPLA.

The civil war ended in January 2005. In August, Machar became Vice President of the Government of Southern Sudan and SPLM Co-chair of the Joint Executive Political Committee. When South Sudan became independent, in July 2011 he was appointed first vice president of the new republic. On 15 July 2011 Machar represented South Sudan at the ceremony when his country's flag was raised outside United Nations headquarters in New York.

== South Sudan politics ==
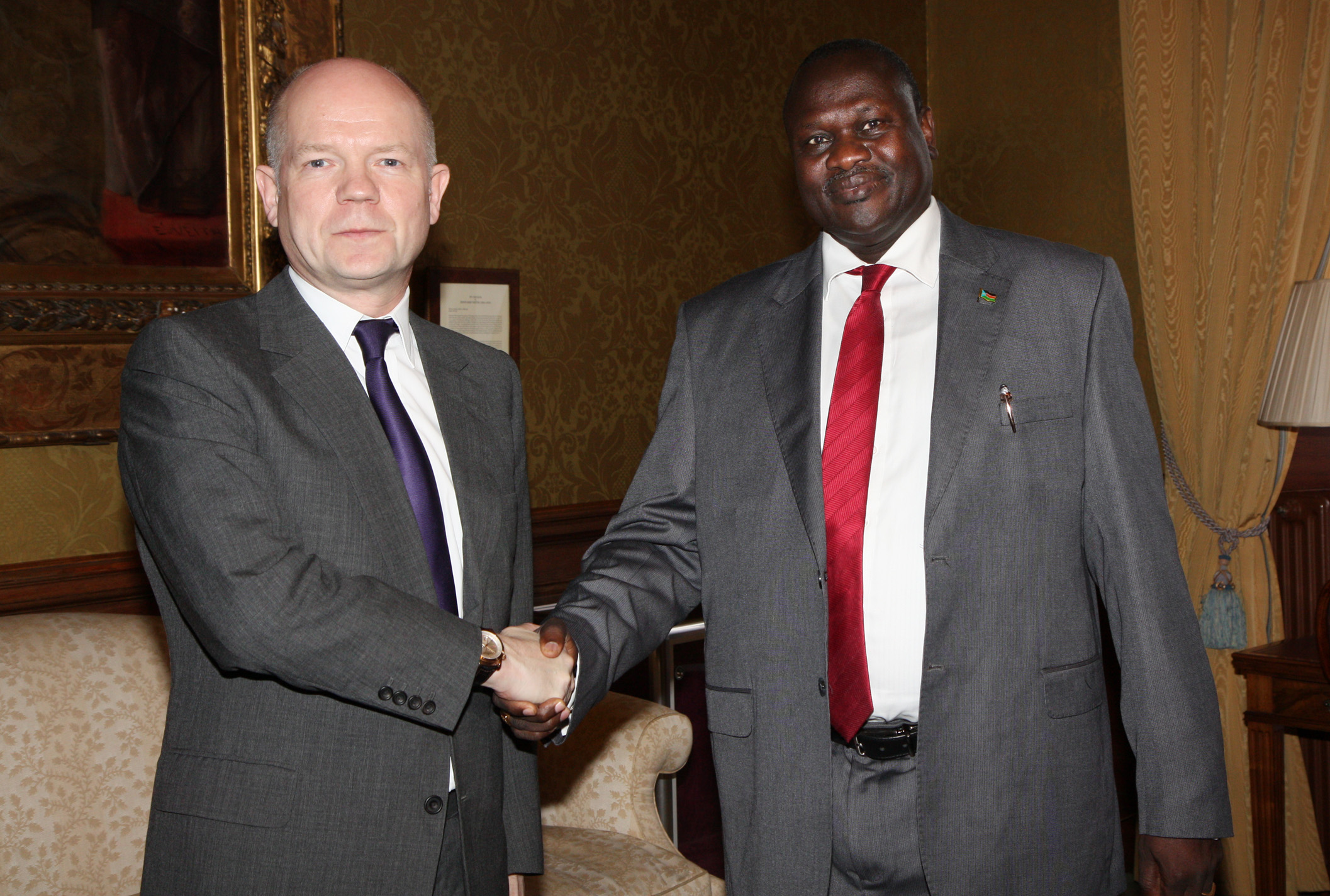
Machar with UK Foreign Secretary William Hague in London in January 2013

Following the independence of South Sudan, Machar was the vice president of the country. In 2012, he publicly apologized for his part in the Bor massacre as he prepared to pave way for taking the helm of SPLM.

By February 2013 Machar publicly stated his intentions to challenge President Kiir. In July 2013, he, and the entire cabinet, was dismissed from office. Machar said that Kiir's move was a step towards dictatorship. These events in turn led to the South Sudanese Civil War.

After the civil war started, Machar turned towards a "shadowy" group of European arms dealers to arm his forces. Little is known about them. An exception was the Franco-Polish arms dealer Pierre Dadak who at the time of his arrest at Ibiza villa on 14 July 2016 was negotiating to sell Machar 40,000 AK-47 assault rifles, 30,000 PKM machine guns and 200,000 boxes of ammunition.

=== Return to vice-presidency and second sacking ===
In late August 2015, a peace agreement was signed between the government and Machar's rebels. The agreement would make Riek Machar the vice-president again. In April 2016, as part of the peace deal, Machar returned to Juba and was sworn in as vice-president. Machar fled the capital after renewed fighting between the Kiir loyalists and his own loyalists Juba in July 2016. After a 48-hour ultimatum given by the president to him for returning to Juba to progress with the peace agreement talks passed, the SPLA-IO in Juba appointed lead negotiator Taban Deng Gai to replace Machar and the government accepted him as acting vice-president. Machar said any talks would be illegal because he had fired Gai.

=== After 2017 ===
In October 2017, Machar was under house arrest in South Africa. His house arrest status was lifted in March 2018. Machar's house confinement in South Africa was also criticized by the media. Machar returned to Juba in October 2018 following a peace deal that was signed in September 2018. As of May 2019, he was living in Khartoum, the capital of South Sudan's northern neighbor Sudan, following a six-month delay in the implementation of a power sharing deal that was meant to take effect on 12 May 2019. Machar was appointed First Vice-president of South Sudan on 22 February 2020 as part of the Revitalised Transitional Government of National Unity. On 18 May 2020, Machar and his wife tested positive for COVID-19. In 2021, he hinted that the 2023 South Sudanese general election would be postponed.

=== 2025 arrest and trial ===
In the lead-up to the arrest, Machar wrote an open letter decrying the deployment of Ugandan troops in South Sudan. He argued that their presence violated and endangered the 2018 peace agreement. Foreign Policy saw this as a potential triggering event for his arrest.

According to his party SPLM-IO, on 26 March 2025, Machar was put under house arrest along with his wife, interior minister Angelina Teny, after an armed convoy led by top government officials entered his residence in Juba. Their guards were disarmed and taken to an unknown location. The party stated that the 2018 peace agreement with the government was effectively void as a result. On 28 March, the South Sudanese government announced that Machar was under house arrest. However, on 31 March, President Salva Kiir's press secretary called that description "unfounded" and said that it "does not accurately depict the reality of the situation."

Foreign Policy wrote that Machar had been de facto stripped of authority.

The South Sudanese government charged Machar with plotting rebellion, accusing him of agitating for civil war to prevent upcoming national elections. It announced an investigation into the SPLM-IO and Machar. Additionally, it denied that the peace agreement was void. Machar had been suspected of supporting the Nuer White Army in its fight against the South Sudanese military. The group had attacked and overrun a military base in Nasir that month, amidst mounting tensions. SPLM-IO denied any ongoing links with the White Army, which they had been allied with during the South Sudanese Civil War.

The United Nations Mission in South Sudan has stated that the reported arrest "might lead the country to the brink of civil war".

On 11 September 2025, Machar was charged with murder, treason and crimes against humanity over the March attack in Nasir, which killed 250 government soldiers. He was also suspended from his post as First Vice President. In his first public appearance since his arrest, he was presented inside a cage at court for his trial on 22 September.

== Literary work ==
- Riek Machar. "South Sudan: A history of political domination: A case of self-determination".

== See also ==
- Ethnic violence in South Sudan
- Dinka-Nuer conflict
