= Koch, South Sudan =

Koch
- Location in South Sudan
- Coordinates: 8.595958°N 29.991989°E
- Country: South Sudan
- Region: Greater Upper Nile
- State: Unity State
- County: Koch County
- Time zone: UTC+2 (CAT)

Koch is a community in the Koch County of Unity State, in the Greater Upper Nile region of South Sudan. It is the headquarters of Koch County.

The community lies in Jagei Nuer territory. It is within the Block 5A oil concession. Between 1998 and 2003 the community was attacked many times by government-supported troops or militias. In 2002 the community was repeatedly attacked by a government Antonov bomber and helicopter gunships.

On 31 January 2000, Riek Machar formally resigned from the government and called on his commanders and Nuer chiefs to meet him at Koch. United Nations planes were used under false pretenses to transport leaders to the conference, where the Sudan People's Defence Forces / Democratic Front was announced.
