= South Sudan Defence Forces (militia) =

Militia in South Sudan

- Leaders: Maj. Gen. Paulino Matip Nhial; Riek Machar (1997–2000); Tito Biel (1997–2000); Peter Par Jiek (1997–2000)
- Dates active: 1983–2005
- Groups: Army of Peace; United Democratic Salvation Front; Equatoria Defense Force
- Active regions: Northern South Sudan
- Ideology: Sudanese nationalism
- Wars: Second Sudanese Civil War

The South Sudan Defence Forces (SSDF) was a militia in South Sudan during the Second Sudanese Civil War (1983–2005) in uneasy alliance with the Government of Sudan.

The SSDF provided security for Sudan Armed Forces (SAF) garrisons and for oilfields in the north of South Sudan, and in return was given arms and ammunition, although SSDF political leaders remained deeply suspicious of the Khartoum-based government. The Comprehensive Peace Agreement of 9 January 2005 ended hostilities between the Sudan People's Liberation Army (SPLA) and the government. A year later, the Juba Declaration of 8 January 2006 provided for integration of SSDF soldiers into the SPLA. The SSDF chief of staff Major General Paulino Matip Nhial signed the Juba Declaration and was appointed deputy Commander in Chief of the SPLA.
