= Koch County =

Koch County Jagei
- County
- Location in South Sudan
- Coordinates: 8.595958°N 29.991989°E
- Country: South Sudan
- Region: Greater Upper Nile
- State: Unity State

Area
  - Total: 2,478 sq mi (6,417 km^{2})

Population (2017 estimate)
  - Total: 112,040
  - Density: 45.22/sq mi (17.46/km^{2})
- Time zone: UTC+2 (CAT)

Koch County is an administrative division of Unity State in the Greater Upper Nile region of South Sudan, covering an area in the center of the state.

The administrative centre is the town of Koch. Large villages include Dhor Wang, Thorial, Duar, Wath-Thier and Bieh. According to the Sudan Population and Housing Census, 2008, there were 75,000 persons in Koch County. The population is extremely poor, with widespread illiteracy. There are serious security concerns.

Between April and November 2010, over 35 people died in the county, many of them civilians, from insurgent attacks. There were suspicions that General Gatluak Gai, who came from Koch County, was the leader of the forces responsible for these attacks. As of January 2011 talks were in progress with different people who claimed to represent Gatluak Gai, but the situation was extremely obscure. On 18 July 2011, Gatluak Gai concluded peace talks with the SPLA. Three days later he was killed. His second in command in the "South Sudan Liberation Army" rebel group, Marko Chuol Ruei, claimed responsibility for the death, saying Gatluak Gai had told his fighters to ignore the peace agreement.
