= SPLA-Nasir =

South Sudanese guerrilla organisation (1991–2002)

- Leaders: Riek Machar; Lam Akol; Gordon Kong Chuol; Peter Par Jiek
- Dates active: 28 August 1991 – January 2002
- Merged into: SPLA
- Wars: the Second Sudanese Civil War

The SPLA-Nasir was a splinter faction of the Sudan People's Liberation Army (SPLA), a rebel group that fought in the Second Sudanese Civil War. Originally created as an attempt by the Nuer tribe to replace SPLA leader John Garang in August 1991, it gradually became coopted by and allied with the Sudanese government. The break away of Riek Machar from SPLM/A resulted in Nuer ethnic group massacring Garang's ethnic Dinka in the Bor massacre in 1991. This split resulted in the 1994 National Convention of New Sudan in Chukudum.

The splinter group got its name from the Nasir Declaration, the document written by the group prior their secession.

== Creation ==
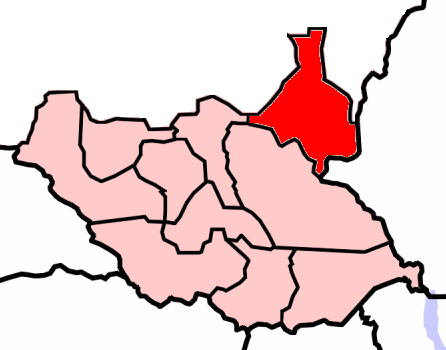
Upper Nile borders Ethiopia to the east.

The Second Sudanese Civil War had begun in 1983 as a response to the status of the underdeveloped South Sudan in relation to the administrative and economic center of Khartoum. The southern rebel groups quickly became dominated by the Sudan People's Liberation Army under John Garang, an ethnic Dinka. However, by the end of the 1980s there was increasing discontent with the lack of any mechanisms to highlight issues within the Movement and seek redress. Widely voiced concerns around this time included that Garang had tied the SPLA too closely with the government of President Mengistu Haile Mariam of Ethiopia in exchange for Ethiopian support and that too many soldiers from Upper Nile and Bahr al-Ghazal had been transferred to be under Garang's direct command along the Equatoria fronts.

The initiative for removing Garang came from Lam Akol, a senior SPLA commander in Upper Nile. Other commanders with whom he initially spoke suggested that he bring in Riek Machar, a well-liked senior commander whose base in Nasir gave him easy access across the Ethiopian border to Gambela and the SPLA rear bases where Lam and Riek could gain political support. By early 1991, the Nuer in Gambela and Upper Nile were strongly behind the idea of a change in leadership. In contrast, most non-Nuer felt that, while administrative reform was needed, Garang did not need to be replaced.

By late 1990, the Mengistu regime was clearly crumbling in the face of the EPRDF rebellion. Refusing to abandon his ties to Mengistu, Garang intensified military efforts to take Juba, the largest town in the south. The conspirators realized that while the fall of Mengistu would weaken Garang, he would be strengthened immensely if he took Juba.

== Coup announcement ==
Mengistu's overthrow in May 1991 caused a number of shifts. With the shifting of forces towards the Western Equatoria offensive and the beginning of the rains, commanders in Upper Nile felt dangerously exposed. At the same time, the Nasir faction noted that Western support for Garang had fallen due to his alliance with the socialist Mengistu; the United States was the only country to respond favorably to the Nasir commanders' call for a separate South, which they interpreted as a sign of support. As thousands of refugees were returned from Ethiopia, the Nasir faction established contact with government forces beginning in July 1991 to arrange for relief supplies through government lines. By May, negotiations had led the government to agree to support the Nasir group against Garang. However, support for an attempt to remove Garang fell among other SPLA commanders, who felt that a coup attempt would further weaken the movement.

The Nasir group first announced that they were overthrowing Garang, via the SPLA radio network, on 28 August 1991; this has subsequently been known as the Nasir Declaration. BBC radio broadcast the announcement at 5pm on 28 August 1991. The Nasir group claimed that Garang was a dictator and that they would install greater democracy in the SPLA and respect human rights more. Riek and Lam were joined in their announcement by Gordon Kong Chuol, a former Anyanya II commander who had advocated secession and had also been allied with the government. The faction led by Garang never changed its name, but was similarly called "SPLA-Torit" or "SPLA-Mainstream" in order to distinguish between the factions.

SPLA-Nasir hoped that their announcement would result in a popular uprising against Garang in Equatoria and Bahr al-Ghazal. However, there had been little preparation for the announcement in these areas. Only the SPLA units already under the Upper Nile command rallied to the call, along with the Nuer Anyanya-2 units promised by the government. Meanwhile, the Meban under Lam's command defected to SPLA-Torit.

== Resulting fighting ==
There was immediately some skirmishing between SPLA troops who declared for Riek and those who remained loyal to Garang. However, the Shilluk SPLA based around the White Nile were deeply riven, resulting in bloody fighting. In September, Garang ordered one of his commanders, William Nyuon Bany, to advance along the Jonglei Canal to Ayod. A series of offensives and counteroffensives resulted. Nasir forces briefly occupied Twic East county, deep in Dinka territory, in November and December, resulting in clear attacks aimed at killing and displacing civilians. The human rights violations resulted in a loss of support for SPLA-Nasir both domestically and abroad. It also became increasingly clear that SPLA-Nasir was receiving military support from the Sudanese government, leading many to suspect that they were forming an alliance.

The topic of Sudanese support to SPLA-Nasir is highly controversial. Riek's influential wife Emma McCune denied any such connection and Riek's numerous supporters refused to believe the leaked evidence. In September 1991, Lam established contact with government representative Ali al-Hajj Muhammad, who funneled money through SPLA-Nasir's Nairobi office. Similarly, an SPLA-Nasir representative was sent to Khartoum to set up a liaison office, where he met Omar al-Bashir, Hassan al-Turabi and army commanders. The stance of SPLA-Torit, who were able to monitor government support activities over radio, was that this proved that the coup was entirely a plot of the government. In an attempt to cause a similar split in the north, Torit forces were put under the command of Daud Bolad and sent to start an insurgency in Darfur, western Sudan. Sources within SPLA-Nasir present a picture in which the leaders thought they could use government support tactically to quickly overthrow Garang, while maintaining an anti-government strategy. When the initial coup failed, the Nasir command required more government support and thus was increasingly directed by Khartoum. In January 1992, the Nasir faction and Khartoum announced an agreement in Frankfurt. The agreement, which contained no mention of independence for the south, caused two Dinka members of the negotiating delegation to quit in disgust.

The split in the southern rebel movement and SPLA-Nasir support allowed the government to regain the initiative and seize territory it had previously lost. In the 1992 government offensive, troops moved freely through SPLA-Nasir territory and regained parts of Jonglei and East Equatoria by July. SPLA-Torit launched a major attack on Juba in response that proved unsuccessful. The government and SPLA-Nasir also persuaded William Nyuon Bany to defect to their side in September 1992.

The government refrained from a large-scale offensive the following year. This was partly due to concerns that the American Operation Provide Relief and subsequent operations in Somalia might lead them to declare a no-fly zone over Southern Sudan. Regardless, there were significant land engagements through the 1992–1993 dry season. Also, at the beginning of 1993, Nyuon moved south and established lines of communication with the Lord's Resistance Army (LRA), a rebel group active in northern Uganda. The government would eventually agree to supply the LRA in return for the LRA attacking the SPLA-United lines of supply across the Ugandan border. In 1993, the organization announced that it was changing its name to "SPLA-United". Khartoum resumed full scale operations for the 1994 dry season, but SPLA-Torit had begun to regain the initiative as their diplomatic climate improved and increasing signs of economic and social strain in the north from the war.

== Dissolution ==
The collaboration of SPLA-United with the government increasingly harmed its support among the populace as well as caused troops to leave in disillusionment. From 26 September to 16 October 1994, SPLA-United held a National Convention in Akobo and announced that it was renaming itself the South Sudan Independence Movement/Army (SSIM/A). However, Lam Akol left the convention in protest at a proposal for self-determination for areas outside of the south. He later announced that he was the chairman of the SPLA-United, based in Tonga, that was separate from the newly renamed SSIM/A. (Depending on the source and time period, "SPLA-United" may thus refer to one of two organizations.)

By January 1995, Riek had publicly repudiated Lam, Nyuon and Kerubino for their collaboration with the government. As each left, they created yet another rebel group. These were joined by other government-sponsored rebel groups during the latter half of the 1990s. In January 2002, Riek and Garang were reconciled and Riek was brought back within the SPLA. The war ended with a peace agreement in January 2005 and Garang went on to become the first southern Vice President in Sudanese history. His death later that year resulted in Riek becoming the vice-president of autonomous Southern Sudan.

== See also ==
- Nuer White Army
