= Peter Gadet =

Sudanese general (c.1958–2019)

Peter Gatdet Yak (c.1958 – 15 April 2019), better known as Peter Gatdet, was a South Sudanese general and SPLA commander who became the leader of the South Sudan Liberation Army (SSLA), a rebel movement in South Sudan.

== Early life ==
He was born between 1957 and 1959 in Mayom County, South Sudan. He was an ethnic Bul Nuer.

== Career ==
Gadet began his military career from 1981 to 1983 in the Sudanese expeditionary contingent deployed to help Iraq in the Iran–Iraq War.

General Gadet was a commander in the Sudan People's Liberation Army (SPLA) during the Second Sudanese Civil War. He joined the SPLA after the Juba Declaration of 8 January 2006, but said that he was marginalised and that the army was dominated by tribal nepotism. In April 2011 Gadet emerged as leader of the South Sudan Liberation Army (SSLA), a new rebel group demanding a more broadly-based government. In Unity State, he began an assault on the SPLA, leaving at least 45 people dead. According to the military, 20 of the victims were southern army soldiers.

In August 2011, SSLA's spokesperson has said that the movement has declared a ceasefire with the government. Gadet integrated his forces into the army and became the 8th Division Commander.

=== South Sudanese Civil War ===
During the South Sudanese Civil War (starting in December 2013), he mutinied again and his mainly Nuer militia claimed control of Bor, South Sudan. Riek Machar said that Gadet had been installed as military governor of Jonglei. In July 2014, the European Union imposed sanctions on Gadet, accusing him of leading an attack of the town of Bentiu, in which about 400 people were killed in the 2014 Bentiu massacre.

On 11 August 2015, Gabriel Tang, Gathoth Gatkuoth, former Sudan People's Liberation Movement-in-Opposition (SPLM-IO) logistics chief, and Gadet announced that they had split from Machar, believing him to be "seeking power for himself". They rejected ongoing peace talks and announced that they would now combat Machar's forces in addition to government forces, saying, "They (Machar and President Salva Kiir) are symbols of hate, division and failed leadership, both leaders were responsible for starting the crisis."

Gatkuoth stated that he wished for a President who is neither Dinka nor Nuer, and that he intended to register his group as a political group called the "Federal Democratic Party". Gadet became Chairman of the Military Command Council of Federal Democratic Party/South Sudan Armed Forces.

In January 2015, widespread deliberate killing of civilians took place in Bor by forces under the control of Gadet, including 14 women being killed in a church compound. In May the US imposed sanctions on Gadet.

== Personal life ==
His wife is the daughter of Gatluak Gai, a rebel general. He was also on the board of advisers of the US-based Jarch Management Group, which has obtained oil concessions on large areas of land in South Sudan.

== Death ==
Gadet died of a heart attack in Khartoum on 15 July 2019. The Sudan People's Liberation Movement-in-Opposition, led by Machar, issued a message of condolence.

== See also ==
- David Yau Yau
- George Athor
- Gabriel Tang
