= Anyanya II =

Paramilitary group of Southern Sudan

- Leaders: Samuel Gai Tut; Abdullah Chol
- Dates active: 1978–1989
- Group: Predominantly Nuers
- Active regions: South Sudan
- Ideology: Southern Sudanese separatism Anti-Addis Ababa Agreement; Nuer interests

Anyanya II is the name taken in 1978 by a dissident group of the 64 tribes of South Sudan who took up arms. The name implies continuity with the Anyanya, or Anya-Nya, movement of the First Sudanese Civil War (1955-1972).

When the Addis Ababa Agreement fell apart in 1983, marking the beginning of the Second Sudanese Civil War, the Sudan People's Liberation Movement/Army (SPLM/A) was founded. Competition between Anyanya II and the SPLM/A led to the eventual defeat of Anyanya II. Some of its members were incorporated into the ranks of the SPLM/A, and others were consolidated into a militia supported by the government of Sudan. Those who did not join either came to form, along with tribal militias that emerged in response to the lawlessness of some SPLM/A units, the South Sudan Defense Forces.

The Anya Nya II group was formed among southern mutineers from the army (after first splitting off from the rebel movement and obtaining weapons and training from the SPAF), was a major factor in the war between 1984 and 1987. Predominantly from the Nuer, the second largest ethnic group in the south, Anya Nya II fought in rural areas of Aali an Nil on behalf of the government. Anya Nya II emerged as a significant factor in the war in that province, disrupting SPLA operations and interfering with the movement of SPLA recruits to the Ethiopian border area for training. Anya Nya II units were structured with military ranks and were based near various army garrisons. The government assisted the group in establishing a headquarters in Khartoum as part of regime efforts to promote Anya Nya II as an alternative southern political movement in opposition to the SPLA. Eventually, however, SPLA military success led to a decline in morale within Anya Nya II and induced major units, along with their commanders, to defect to the SPLA beginning in late 1987. By mid-1989, only one Anya Nya II faction remained loyal to the government; it continued its close relations with the government after the Bashir coup and retained its political base in Khartoum.

After the coup of 1989 by President Omar al-Bashir, South Sudan remained under Sudan for 16 years. On 9 January 2005, a comprehensive peace agreement was signed at Nyayo Stadium in Nairobi, Kenya which gave a green light to self-determination. As told by late Dr. John Garang de Mabior, "South Sudanese will eventually seek to remain a state through self-determination process in term of Referendum to decide either to remain under United Sudan or as New Sudan which will be seen in amicable separation."
