= South Sudan People's Defence Forces =

Combined military forces of South Sudan

- Flag of the South Sudan People's Defence Forces
- Founded: 1983
- Current form: 2018
- Service branches: Ground Force; Air Force and Air Defence; Riverine/Navy
- Headquarters: Bilpham, Central Equatoria; Malual-Chaat, Bor; Wunyiek, Northern Bahr el Ghazal; Mapel, Western Bahr el Ghazal

Leadership
- Commander-in-chief: Salva Kiir
- Minister of Defence and Veterans Affairs: Chol Thon Balok
- Chief of Defense Forces: General Santino Deng Wol

Personnel
- Military age: 18
- Active personnel: 185,000

Expenditure
- Budget: £10,240,750,031 SSP ($78,615,712) [2016/17]
- Percent of GDP: 0.86% (2015 est.)

Industry
- Domestic suppliers: Military Industry Corporation

Related articles
- History: Military history of South Sudan: South Sudanese wars of independence; Second Sudanese Civil War; First Congo War; Lord's Resistance Army insurgency; Khoriom Battalion Fierce Fighters; Disarmament of the Lou Nuer; Battle of Malakal; Heglig Crisis; South Sudanese Civil War; Abyei border conflict (2022–present)
- Ranks: Military ranks of South Sudan

The South Sudan People's Defence Forces (Note: "Defence" is spelt "Defense" in the name in some sources.) (SSPDF), formerly the Sudan People's Liberation Army (SPLA), also called Sudan People's Liberation Army/Movement (SPLA/M), is the military force of South Sudan. The SPLA was founded as a guerrilla movement against the government of Sudan in 1983 and was a key participant of the Second Sudanese Civil War and the subsequent independence of South Sudan. It was led by John Garang, who died in 2005 and was succeeded by Salva Kiir. As of 2010, the SPLA was divided into divisions of 10,000–14,000 soldiers.

Following the Comprehensive Peace Agreement in 2005, the last remaining large and well-equipped militia, the South Sudan Defence Forces (SSDF), under General Paulino Matiep, signed an agreement with Kiir known as the Juba Declaration, which amalgamated the two forces under the SPLA banner.

Following South Sudan's independence in 2011, Kiir became President and the SPLA became the new republic's regular army. In May 2017 there was a restructure and the SPLA took on the name of South Sudan Defence Forces (SSDF), with another change in September 2018 to South Sudan People's Defence Forces. As of 2018, the army was estimated to have 185,000 soldiers as well as an unknown number of personnel in the small South Sudan Air Force. As of 2019, the SSPDF comprised the Ground Force, Air Force, Air Defence Forces and Presidential Guard.

== History ==
=== 1983: Inception ===
On 16 May 1983 105 Battalion launched a mutiny in Malual-Chaat barrack, Bor against the Sudanese army which later inspired a number of mutinies in the southern region including those at Ayod, Pochalla, and Pibor. These mutinies led to the creation of the SPLA later that year.

At its inception John Garang was the SPLA's Commander-in-Chief. Kerubino Kuanyin Bol was appointed second ranking Commander, and William Nyuon Bany third. By June 1983, the majority of mutineers had moved to Ethiopia or were on their way there. The Ethiopian government's decision to support the emerging SPLA was a means of exacting revenge upon the Sudanese government for its support of Eritrean rebels.

The SPLA struggled for a united and secular Sudanese state. Garang said the struggle of the South Sudanese was the same as that of marginalised groups in the north, such as the Nuba and Fur peoples. Until 1985, the SPLA directed its public denouncements of the Sudanese government specifically at Sudanese President, Gaafar Nimeiry. During the years that followed, SPLA propaganda denounced the Khartoum government as a family affair that played on sectarian tensions. The SPLA denounced the introduction of Sharia law in September 1983.

=== War in the 1980s ===
Official flag of the Sudan People's Liberation Army until 2011

The first fully-fledged SPLA battalion graduated in 1984 in the village of Bilpam. The name 'Bilpam' carried great symbolic importance for SPLA for years to come, as the epicentre of the uprising. After Bilpam, other SPLA training camps were established at Dimma, Bonga and Panyido.

In the mid-1980s the SPLA armed struggle blocked development projects of the Sudanese government, such as the Bentiu Oil Fields.

The SPLA launched its first advance into Equatoria in 1985 and 1986. During this campaign, the SPLA were confronted by a number of pro-government militias. The conduct of SPLA forces was chaotic, with many atrocities against the civilian population. The SPLA drove out around 35,000 Ugandan refugees (who had settled in Equatoria since the early 1980s) back into Uganda.

The SPLA had a complicated relationship with the Anyanya II, a fellow southern Sudanese rebel group. The Anyanya II forces blocked the expansion of the SPLA between 1984 and 1987, as Anyanya II attacked SPLA recruits heading for Ethiopia. The Anyanya II also attacked civilians believed to be SPLA supporters. The conflict between Anyanya II and SPLA had a political dimension, as Anyanya II sought to build an independent southern Sudanese state. The SPLA tried to win over the leaders of Anyanya II. The Anyanya II commander Gordon Kong Chuol aligned with The SPLA in late 1987. Other sectors of the Anyanya II followed his example over the ensuing years, marginalizing the remainder of the Anyanya II who were allied with the Sudanese government.

Another force that confronted SPLA were the Murahaleen militias in northern Bahr el-Ghazal. Warfare between SPLA and Murahaleen began in 1987. By 1988 SPLA controlled most of the northern Bahr el-Ghazal. Unlike the Anyanya II, the Murahaleen had no political ambitions.

In March 1986, the SPLA kidnapped a Norwegian aid worker of the Christian NGO Kirkens Nødhjelp (Norwegian Church Aid). Moorcroft writes that by this time, 'training, weapons, and discipline improved as the guerillas won more and more victories. In November 1987 the guerillas captured the small town of Kurmak near the Ethiopian border. It was 450 miles from the capital, but the nearby dam provided most of Khartoum's electricity.'

=== Political openings ===
The SPLA boycotted the 1986 Sudanese parliamentary election. In half of the constituencies of southern Sudan elections could not be held due to the SPLA boycott.

On 15 November 1988, the SPLA entered into an alliance with the Democratic Unionist Party (DUP). The two groups agreed on the lifting of the state of emergency and abolition of Sharia law. The press release was made public through an announcement on Radio SPLA. After the DUP rejoined the government, a ceasefire with the SPLA was achieved. After the elections, negotiations between the SPLA and Sadiq al-Mahdi started, but were aborted after the SPLA shot down a civilian airplane, killing 60 people.

All peace talks ended following the 1989 Sudanese coup d'état. In September 1989, the ruling Revolutionary Command Council for National Salvation (RCC) invited different sectors to a 'National Dialogue Conference', but the SPLA refused to attend.

The SPLA launched a major offensive between 1989 and the fall of the Ethiopian Derg government in 1991. It captured various towns, such as Bor, Waat, Maridi, Mundri, Yambio, Kaya, Kajo Keji, Nimule, Kapoeta, Torit, Akobo and Nasir. By the middle of 1991, the SPLA controlled most parts of southern Sudan with the exception of the major garrison towns (Juba, Yei, Malakal and Wau) Between 21 and 29 January 1990, SPLA shelled Juba. SPLA forces also moved into the Nuba Mountains and the southern parts of the Blue Nile State. In comparison with its 1985–1986 offensive in Equatoria, the conduct of SPLA was now more orderly.

=== 1991: Setback and split ===
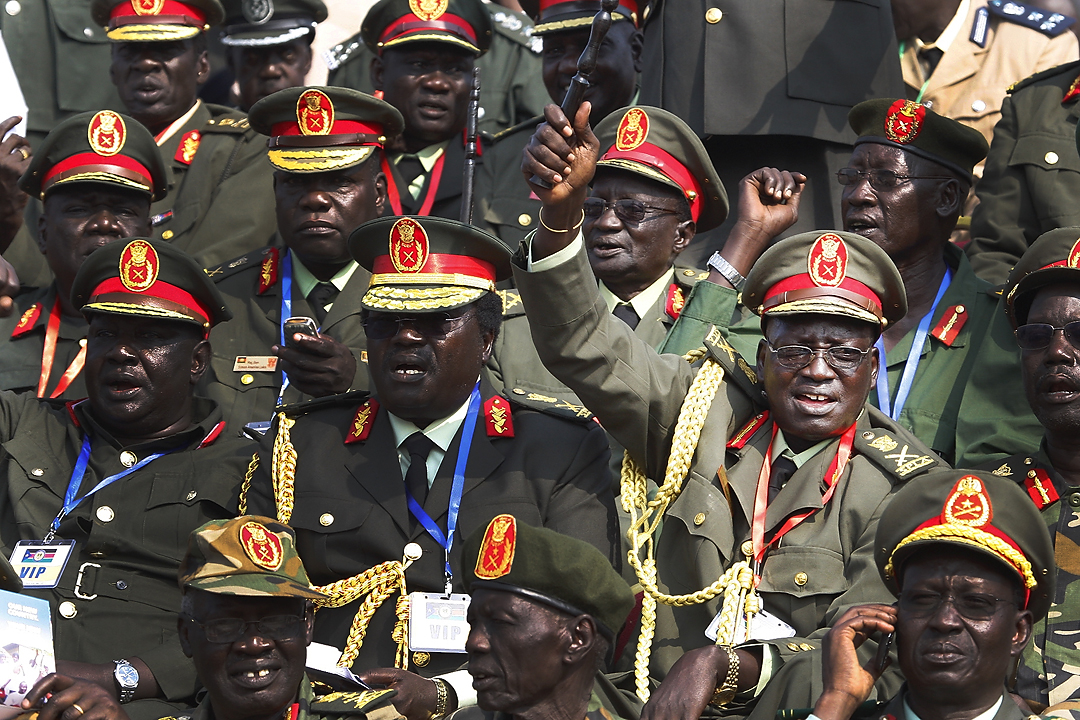
High-ranking SPLA officers at the South Sudan independence celebrations, 2011

The downfall of the Derg government in Ethiopia in May 1991 proved to be a major setback. The Ethiopian government had provided the SPLA with military supplies, training facilities and a safe haven for bases for 18 years. Soon after the change of government in Ethiopia, the SPLA accompanied hundreds of thousands of refugees back into Sudan.

A split in the SPLA had simmered since late 1990, as Lam Akol and Riek Machar began to question Garang's leadership. Akol began secretly contacting SPLA officers to join his side, especially among the Nuer and Shilluk peoples. The situation deteriorated after the fall of the Derg. As the Derg regime crumbled, Akol published a document titled Why Garang Must Go Now. The split was made public on 28 August 1991, in what became known as the Nasir Declaration. The dissidents called for democratization of SPLA, a stop to human rights abuses, and an independent southern Sudan (Garang's goal of creating a united and secular Sudan). Kong Coul joined the rebellion. The 'SPLA-Nasir' was joined by the SPLA forces in Ayod, Waat, Adok, Abwong, Ler and Akobo. A period of chaos reigned inside the SPLA, as it was not clear which units sided with Garang and which with the SPLA-Nasir.

Garang issued a statement through the SPLA radio communications system, denouncing the coup. Nine out of eleven (excluding himself) SPLA PMHC members sided with Garang. The mainstream SPLA led by Garang was based in Torit. The two SPLA factions fought each other, including attacks on civilians in their opponents' territory.

=== Battles of 1992 ===
As of 1992 the Sudanese government launched a major offensive against the SPLA, which was weakened by the split with the SPLA-Nasir. The SPLA lost control of Torit (where the SPLA was headquartered), Bor, Yirol, Pibor, Pochalla and Kapoeta.

The SPLA made two attacks on Juba in June–July 1992, during which they nearly captured the town. After the attacks, the Sudanese government forces committed harsh reprisals against the civilian population. Summary executions of suspected SPLA collaborators were carried out. On 27 September 1992 the deputy commander-in-chief of the SPLA, William Nyuon, defected and took a section of fighters with him. The SPLA recaptured Bor on 29 November 1991.

=== Mid-1990s ===
As of the mid-1990s, the majority of the population of southern Sudan lived in areas under the control of either the mainstream SPLA or the SPLA-Nasir.

=== 2005 Comprehensive Peace Agreement ===
In 2004, a year before the Comprehensive Peace Agreement (CPA), the Coalition to Stop Child Soldiers, estimated that there were between 2,500 and 5,000 children serving in the SPLA.

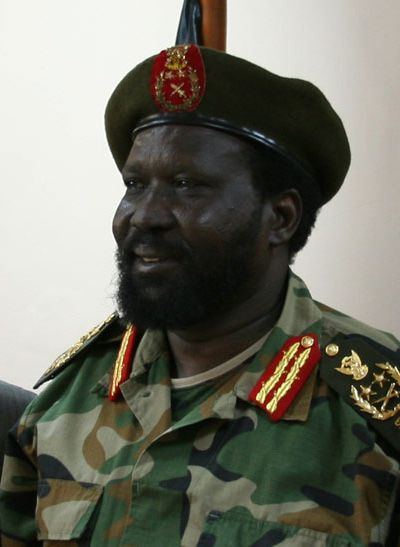
Salva Kiir Mayardit, Commander-in-Chief of SPLA

Following the signing of the CPA, an SPLA reorganisation process began. This process was actively supported by funding from the United States. In 2005, Garang restructured the top leadership of the SPLA, with a Chief of General Staff, Lt. Gen. Oyay Deng Ajak, and four Deputy Chiefs of General Staff: Maj. Gen. Salva Mathok Gengdit (Administration), Maj. Gen. Bior Ajang Aswad (Operations), Maj. Gen. James Hoth Mai (Logistics) and Maj. Gen. Obuto Mamur Mete (Political and Moral Orientation).

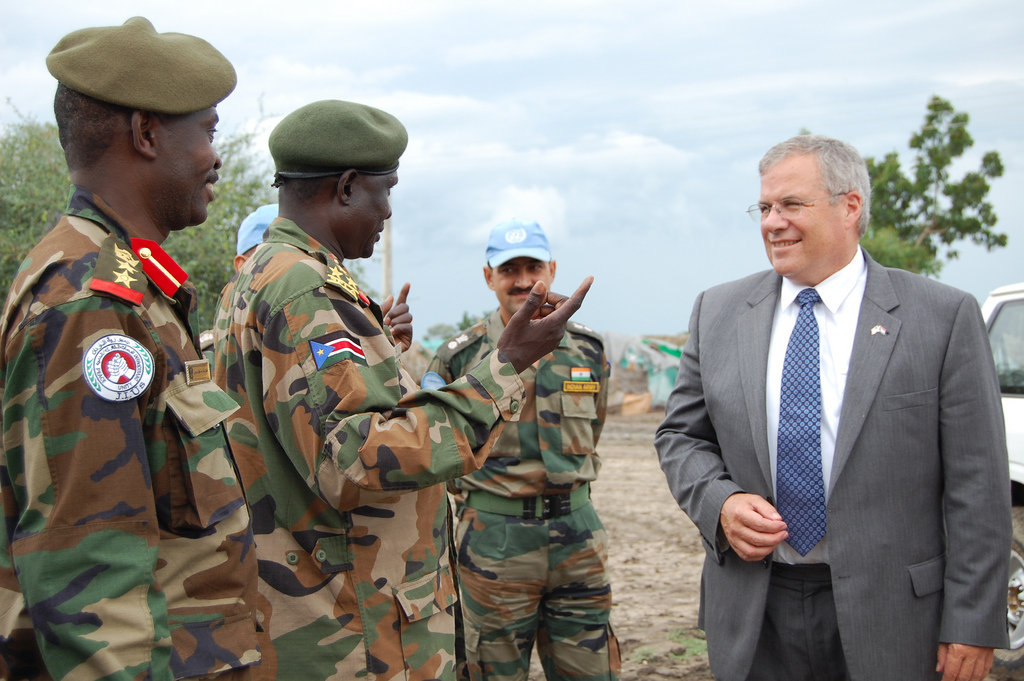
SPLA officer as part of Joint Integrated Units during the CPA era

The initial organisation of the SPLA, based on divisions, was assembled in mid-2005 but not actually put into practice in the field until 2006. It was based on six divisions (in Upper Nile State; 2nd Division: Equatorias; 3rd Division: Northern Bahr el Ghazal and Warrap states; 4th Division Unity State; the 5th Division in Lakes State, the 6th Division, SPLA personnel in the Joint Integrated Units) and four independent brigades. The four independent brigades grouped SPLA forces in Bor (Khoriom, 104, and 105 Battalions mainly), Southern Blue Nile, the Nuba Mountains (South Kordofan) and Raja (Western Bahr el Ghazal).

Probably more important than the reorganisation was the Juba Declaration, signed by Salva Kiir and General Paulino Matiep on 8 January 2006. Matiep commanded the South Sudan Defence Forces (SSDF), the largest and best-equipped militia (about 50,000 men) that remained beyond the SPLA's control. Paulino was appointed Deputy Commander-in-chief, the second highest position, his subordinate generals became part of the SPLA without any reduction in rank, and about 50,000 SSDF were added to the SPLA payroll. The number of generals in the SPLA also rose as Kiir promoted hundreds of existing SPLA officers to match the arriving ex-SSDF generals. By 2011 and independence, the SPLA had 745 generals. At about the same time, the legislature voted to double infantrymen's base pay from the equivalent of $75 a month (the rate under Khartoum's control) to $150. The unification of the two largest armed groups in the region seriously weakened Khartoum's control of southern Sudan.

In 2007 and 2008 the independent brigades in Blue Nile, Bor, and the Nuba Mountains became the 10th, 8th, and 9th divisions, respectively. The 9th and 10th Divisions thus fell north of the 1-1-56 Independence dividing line between North and South Sudan. The last independent brigade, in Raja, became part of the 5th Division.

=== Ministry of Defence ===
In 2007, the SPLM/A established a Ministry of Defence. Gen. Dominic Dim Deng, an SPLA veteran, was chosen as the first Minister for SPLA Affairs and the first political officer of the SPLA. Dim died in a plane crash in 2008 alongside his wife, Josephine Apieu Jenaro Aken, and other SPLA officers. He is buried alongside his wife at the SPLA headquarters in Bilpham, Juba.

Deputy Chief of Staff (Logistics) James Hoth Mai replaced Oyay Deng Ajak as Chief of General Staff in May 2009.

In 2010 U.S. diplomats reported that Samora "made a point to discuss how the SPLA needed to be reorganized. He stated that the SPLA was top heavy, carrying nearly 550 general officers and providing more than 200 security guards for each minister."

The 2005 Comprehensive Peace Agreement stipulated that the SPLA in northern Sudan were to move south of the 1956 North-South boundary during the interim period, excepting those part of the Joint Integrated Units, composed of equal numbers from the SPLA and the Sudanese Armed Forces. Officially, this move did take place, in 2008, with the 10th Division relocating its headquarters to Guffa, five kilometers south of the Blue Nile-Upper Nile border, and most of its troops to al-Fuj, Yafta and Marinja on the southern side. But more than 1,600 fighters remained north of the line. In early June 2011, following the lack of progress on popular consultations in Southern Kordofan & Blue Nile, the SAF attempted to forcefully disarm Nuba SPLA soldiers, and fighting began in Southern Kordofan. After the fighting began, former SPLA 9th and 10th Division fighters proclaimed themselves the Sudan People's Liberation Movement-North (SPLA-N), under Malik Agar as Chairman and Commander-in-Chief.

The Government of Southern Sudan named the SPLA General Headquarters outside Juba 'Bilpam'. The headquarters staff was expanded after 2008 to match the ten-division structure. This expansion coincided with the completion of the General Headquarters at Bilpam, built by DynCorp with funds from the U.S. State Department's Africa Peacekeeping Program (AFRICAP).

Work on a national security strategy began in late 2012.

=== Southern Civil War ===
On 15 December 2013, fighting broke out in Juba between different factions of the armed forces in what the South Sudanese government described as a coup d'état. President Kiir announced that the attempt had been put down the next day, but fighting resumed 16 December. Military spokesman Colonel Philip Aguer said that some military installations had been attacked by armed soldiers but that "the army is in full control of Juba." He added that an investigation was under way.

Eventually the Sudan People's Liberation Movement split into two main factions, divided on the issue over leadership of the ruling party:

- The Sudan People's Liberation Movement (In Government) (SPLM-IG) was led by President Kiir; it was the ruling faction that signed the Comprehensive Peace Agreement in January 2005. Kiir served as president of the Transitional Autonomous Region of South Sudan from its formation in 2005 after Garang's death until the country's independence in 2011. The SPLM-IO faction formally withdrew from the SPLM ruling faction in 2013.
- The Sudan People's Liberation Movement (In Opposition) (SPLM-IO) was formed in 2013 and is led by former South Sudan Vice President Riek Machar. The group is the major opponent to the SPLM-IG faction in the Southern Sudanese civil war.

The coordination of the April–July 2015 attack by the SPLA-IG in Unity State—involving multiple divisions across multiple sectors—indicates a high level of operational planning from Juba. The ferocity with which people were chased into the swamps to be killed was aimed at annihilating the SPLM/A-in-Opposition's support, and led to systematic destruction of villages and towns.

The Tiger Faction New Forces (also called Tiger Faction or 'The Tigers') split from the SPLA in late October 2015. A Shilluk militia, it aimed to reverse the division of South Sudan into 28 (later 32) states in order to restore the territory of the Shilluk Kingdom to its 1956 borders. Led by Yoanis Okiech, the TFNF started an insurgency against the SPLM government. In 2016, however, it also came into conflict with the SPLM-IO rebels, leading to Okiech's death and the group's destruction in January 2017.

Over the course of the war, the SPLA has become dominated by Dinka, in particular Dinka from greater Bahr el-Ghazal. The Panel of Experts wrote in 2016, "While other tribes are represented in SPLA, they are increasingly marginalized, rendering the multi-tribal structure of the army largely a façade that obscures the central role that Dinka now play in virtually all major theatres of the conflict". (S/2016/963, 8)

=== 2017–2018: SSPDF ===
On 16 May 2017, Kiir announced a restructure of the army and change of name to the South Sudan Defence Forces (SSDF).

A cessation of hostilities agreement was reached in December 2017, but never really took effect. In August 2017, Kiir announced that the new name for the army would be the South Sudan People's Defence Forces (SSPDF) "by the need to represent the will of the people". He said that there was a need to reorganise and professionalise the army. According to Professor Joel Isabirye, the change of name would shift the discourse from the era of liberation, which had now concluded, to one of national defence, which is ongoing – with the focus on defending the country against external aggression. The insertion of "People's" into the name "could be to avoid being dragged back into history when during the Second Sudanese Civil War (1983–2005) a militia called South Sudan Defense Forces (SSDF) emerged and aligned with the Government of Sudan".

The negotiations stalled over disagreement among the parties about power sharing, future security arrangements and whether Riak Machar could return from exile to political life in South Sudan. In early May 2018, a two-day meeting of the Parties to the Revitalized Agreement on the Resolution of the Conflict in South Sudan (R-ARCSS) started in Addis Ababa. The parties were to take stock of the progress so far of the R-ARCSS, the pending tasks, and debate the way forward.

The army was officially renamed South Sudan People's Defence Forces in September 2018 by a Republican order read on the state-owned TV channel SSBC known as South Sudan Broadcasting Services, the national television in South Sudan. The renaming occurred ten days before implementation of new security arrangements, which include the reunification of the national army. President Kiir was also Commander-in-Chief of the army.

As of 2018, the army was estimated to have 185,000 soldiers as well as an unknown number of personnel in the small South Sudan Air Force.

According to the CIA World Factbook as of June 2020, "under the September 2018 peace agreement, all armed groups in South Sudan were to assemble at designated sites where fighters could be either disarmed and demobilized, or integrated into unified military and police forces; the unified forces were then to be retrained and deployed prior to the formation of a national unity government; all fighters were ordered to these sites in July 2019, but as of April 2020 this process had not been completed".

=== 2019 ===
As of 2019, the SSPDF comprised the Ground Forces, Air Force, Air Defense Forces, and Presidential Guard with Special attachment of Captain Buoi Rual Makuei, batch 51 Sudan military College Graduate.

In October 2019, more than 40 members of South Sudan People's Defense Forces (SSPDF) undertook a two-day training organised by the United Nations Mission in South Sudan (UNMISS) in Kuajok, Gogrial. UNMISS has been in the country since 2011, aiming to consolidate peace and achieve security to allow economic growth and political stability. They were deploying more than 19,000 personnel in the country as of September 2019.

=== 2026 gold mine attack ===
A gold mine at Jebel Iraq in Central Equatoria, near Juba, which was under the control of SSPDF forces, was attacked by gunman during March 28–29, 2026, killing over 70 individuals.

== Structure ==
=== General Staff ===
The COGS oversaw five directorates, each led by a Deputy Chief of General Staff (DCOGS):

- Administration
- Operations
- Logistics
- Political and Moral Orientation
- Training and Research

=== SSPDF organization ===
The SPLA had nine divisions and a small air force, all of which reported to the DCOGS, Operations:

SSPDF Divisions in cantonment in August 2020

- 1st Division: Renk, Upper Nile State. Established 2006. After the CPA, George Athor was appointed a major general and confirmed in overall commander of Division I (2005–07) before being moved to SPLA HQ in Bilpam as director for administration. The Small Arms Survey wrote in early 2016 that '...[the] Division, stationed in Renk and widely regarded as the best fighting force in the country, is largely Nuer. Until 2 December 2015, it was under the command of Stephen Buay, a Bul Nuer who was subsequently redeployed to lead the SPLA's 4th Division in Rubkona, Unity State.'
- 2nd Division: Giada Barracks, Juba, Central Equatoria State Established 2006. By 2013 division headquarters was at Mogiri east of Juba. On 19 August 2011, it was reported that the UN SRSG would visit Kapoeta to meet the County Commissioner and the Commander of Brigade 9 of the SPLA's 2nd Division.
- 3rd Division - Lion Division: Akuem, Wodyik Lion, Northern Bahr el Ghazal (also covers Warrap State)
- 4th Division: Mapel, Western Bahr el Ghazal (formerly at Rubkona). Established 2006. Rands wrote in 2010 that "Upon integrating into the SPLA, the core forces of Paulino Matiep, under the command of Tahib Gatluak, [remained] in Mayom County in Unity State. Some were then redeployed to Juba to join Matiep's bodyguard. The remaining men were deployed as part of the 4th Division in Duar, Unity State." News reports on 21 December 2013 from Bentiu said the 4th Division commander, James Koang Chuol, had declared that he had deposed the caretaker governor and that his forces were no longer loyal to President Salva Kiir. Chuol said he had overthrown Governor Joseph Monytuel after surviving an assassination attempt. Koang said that the 4th Division's tank unit tried to kill him at around 7pm on Friday upon being ordered by Monytuel at the behest of senior SPLA members in Juba. Significant forces from the 4th Division defected to the Sudan People's Liberation Movement-in-Opposition, with their arms and ammunition. The 4th Division was involved in the April–July Unity State offensive by the SPLA, alongside Bul Nuer youth, other SPLA forces, and other armed groups. In 2015–16, the division was placed under the command of Stephen Buay.
- 5th Division: Girinti Barracks, Wau, Western Bahr el Ghazal State (formerly at Rumbek).
- 6th Division: Maridi, Western Equatoria. On 13 August 2016, some 800 to 900 troops from the 6th Division launched an incursion into the Democratic Republic of the Congo, engaging in a battle with SPLM/A in Opposition.
- 7th Division: Owachi, Upper Nile State. Rands wrote in 2010 that '...[m]uch of the SPLA's 7th Division operating west of the Nile in the Shilluk areas of Upper Nile State is composed of former forces of the SSDF commander Peter Gadet, now a major general in the SPLA. Gadet stayed with SAF Military Intelligence during the Juba Declaration process and many were suspicious of his allegiances. As of the time of writing when Rands wrote, Gadet's authority over his former men in the 7th Division was unclear.' Still under command of Peter Gadet in 2013. Significant forces from the 7th Division defected to the Sudan People's Liberation Movement-in-Opposition, with their arms and ammunition. Gadet died on 15 April 2019.
- 8th Division: Bor, South Sudan. Formed from the SPLA independent brigades of the 105 Battalion and Khoriom Battalion which all were formed in 1983. The former led the first SPLA rebellion against the Sudanese army Malual-Chaat garrison in Bor that later inspired several other mutinies across the southern region and some parts of northern Sudan. The 8th Division is headquartered in Malual-Chaat barrack which is also designated as a liberation museum to commemorate the first SPLA fallen heroes and the entire history of South Sudan's succession from Sudan.
- Commondo: Formed after the independence of South Sudan under the command of General Abraham Jongroor, one of the Khoriom Battalion commanders who successfully fought out Boma militias with commondo. It was the most well trained SPLA brigade on the front lines, according to the National Military Intelligence.
- Mechanized Division: Mapel, Western Bahr el Ghazal State. Circa 15 July 2017 the SPLA spokesperson announced that the Mechanized Division, with the 8th Infantry Division, was to deploy forces to the Juba-Bor road to ensure the safety of travelers. The move came after a series of deadly road attack by armed men.
- Special Forces brigade with four battalions.
- The Sudan People's Air Force: Juba, Central Equatoria State.

According to a 2015 security agreement with the Sudan People's Liberation Movement-in-Opposition, military forces currently stationed in Juba, Bor and Malakal are to be moved to bases at least 25 kilometers outside of each respective city. The Presidential Guard at Giada Barracks and SPLA's General Headquarters in Bilpam are authorized exceptions to the agreement.

- 9th Infantry Tiger Division: Giada Barracks, Juba, Central Equatoria State. Major General Atem Salva Kiir is current commander.

== Equipment ==
According to a 2015 UN Panel of Experts report, South Sudan had allocated $850 million to purchase military equipment, including four Mi-24 attack helicopters, Chinese missiles, amphibious vehicles, and thousands of automatic rifles from Israeli-associated and Chinese-supplied arms.

In July of 2014, Chinese state-owned Norinco sent a $20-million shipment which included 100 HJ-73D anti-tank guided missile-launching and guidance systems and 1,200 rounds of the missile; 9,574 automatic rifles, as well as 2,394 grenade launchers and 20 million rounds of ammunition; 319 general-purpose machine guns and 2 million rounds of ammunition. China later halted future exports.

Around the same time, the South Sudanese government had obtained 4 Mil Mi-24 helicopters and 10 “GAZ-34039 tracked amphibious vehicles”. The Israeli-produced IWI Galil ACE has been seen within the country.

In December 2017, South Sudan's authorities spent millions of dollars to purchase Israeli surveillance drones and security cameras. The first two drones and 11 cameras will be deployed by Israeli company Global Group. The United Nations imposed an arms embargo on South Sudan in 2018. The UN Security Council extended the embargo in 2026.

As of 2013 the South Sudan Air Force operated the following aircraft:

- 1 x Beechcraft 1900
- 9 x Mil Mi-17
- 1 x Mi-172

In 2015, South Sudan purchased four Mi-24 helicopters from Ukraine.

== Defence expenditure ==
According to the 2013 edition of the International Institute for Strategic Studies' report The Military Balance, South Sudan's defence budgets since 2011 have been as follows:

Year	South Sudanese pounds	US dollar equivalent
2011	1.6bn	533m
2012	2.42bn	537m
2013	2.52bn	

== See also ==
- Democratic Change (South Sudan), formerly Sudan People's Liberation Movement – Democratic Change, a political party
- Sudan Liberation Movement/Army, a Sudanese rebel group active in Darfur, founded as the Darfur Liberation Front
- Sudan People's Liberation Movement (SPLM), a political party in South Sudan founded as the political wing of the SPLA
- Sudan People's Liberation Movement-in-Opposition, a mainly South Sudanese political party that split from the Sudan People's Liberation Movement in 2013
- Sudan People's Liberation Movement–North, a political party and militant organisation in the Republic of Sudan

== Works cited ==
- "The Military Balance 2018". The Military Balance: Annual Estimates of the Nature and Size of the Military Forces of the Principal Powers. London: IISS. 2018. ISSN 0459-7222.
- "The Military Balance 2013". The Military Balance: Annual Estimates of the Nature and Size of the Military Forces of the Principal Powers. London: IISS. 2013. ISSN 0459-7222.
- International Institute for Strategic Studies (15 February 2019). The Military Balance 2019. London: Routledge. ISBN 9781857439885.
- Rands, Richard (2010). In Need of Review: SPLA Transformation in 2006–10 and Beyond (PDF). Small Arms Survey HSBA.
- Rone, Jemera (1994). Civilian Devastation: Abuses by All Parties in the War in Southern Sudan. New York: Human Rights Watch. ISBN 9781564321299. Archived from the original on 11 January 2014.
