= Second Sudanese Civil War =

1983–2005 war for South Sudanese independence

- Part of the Sudanese Civil Wars and the South Sudanese wars of independence
- Sudan People's Liberation Army (SPLA) guerrillas celebrate around a disabled T-55 tank.
Date	5 June 1983 – 9 January 2005 (21 years, 7 months and 4 days)
Location	Blue Nile, Nuba Mountains, Southern Sudan
Result	Stalemate; Comprehensive Peace Agreement; Independence of the Republic of South Sudan following a 2011 referendum

Belligerents
Sudan; Armed Forces; PDF; Army of Peace; Muraheleen; (Rwanda) Ex-FAR and Interahamwe; SSDF; Anyanya II; SPLA dissidents; SPLA-Nasir; SPLA-United; SSIM/A; Nuer White Army; (Uganda) Ugandan insurgents; LRA; WNBF; UNRF (II); Zaire (1994–1997); Iraq (Note: Iraqi support for Sudan during the war mostly consisted of weapons shipments; according to the South Sudanese, however, at least one unit of Iraqi paratroopers fought alongside the SAF near Juba. About 200 Iraqi soldiers were allegedly killed, and the site of their remains became known as "Jebel Iraqi". The International Institute for Strategic Studies also stated that Iraqi forces fought alongside Sudanese government troops.); China (Note: Although China was not officially involved in the war, it sent troops to the country in order to protect oil fields and thereby aid the Sudanese military. China also provided Sudan with weaponry.); Combat aid: Libya (1986–1991); DR Congo (1998–2003); Non-combat aid: Iran; Belarus (from 1996)	SPLA; SPLA-Mainstream; SPLA-Agar; SPDF; ALF; Titweng; SSLM; NDA; Sudanese Alliance Forces; Eastern Coalition; Ethiopia; Derg (until 1987); PDR Ethiopia (1987–1991); FDR Ethiopia (1995–1998); Eritrea (1996–1998, 2002–2005); Uganda (from 1993); Non-combat aid: Libya (1983–1985); Israel; Cuba (until 1991)

Commanders and leaders
(Sudan) Gaafar Nimeiry (Sudan) Suwar al-Dahab (Sudan) Sadiq al-Mahdi (Sudan) Omar al-Bashir; Paulino Matip Nhial (Rwanda) Tharcisse Renzaho; Riek Machar; Lam Akol; Kerubino Kuanyin; Peter Par Jiek (Uganda) Juma Oris (Uganda) Joseph Kony (Zaire) Mobutu Sese Seko	John Garang; Salva Kiir; Dominic Dim Deng; Riek Machar; Lam Akol; Kerubino Kuanyin; James Hoth Mai; Peter Par Jiek; Peter Gadet; Malik Agar; Mengistu Haile Mariam (Ethiopia) Meles Zenawi; Isaias Afwerki; Yoweri Museveni

Strength
Tens of thousands; Ex-FAR: c. 500	Tens of thousands

Casualties and losses
- 1–2 million dead (mostly civilians, due to starvation and drought)

The Second Sudanese Civil War was a conflict from 1983 to 2005 between the central Sudanese government and the Sudan People's Liberation Army. It was largely a continuation of the First Sudanese Civil War of 1955 to 1972. Although it originated in southern Sudan, the civil war spread to the Nuba Mountains and the Blue Nile. It lasted for almost 22 years and is one of the longest civil wars on record. The war resulted in the independence of South Sudan 6 years after the war ended.

Roughly two million people died as a result of the conflict. Four million people in southern Sudan were displaced at least once, normally repeatedly during the war. The civilian death toll is one of the highest of any war since World War II and was marked by numerous human rights violations, including slavery and mass killings.

== Background and causes ==
Wars in Sudan are often characterized as fights between the central government expanding and dominating peoples of the periphery, raising allegations of marginalization. Kingdoms and great powers based along the Nile River have fought against the people of inland Sudan for centuries. Since at least the 18th century, central governments have attempted to regulate and exploit the undeveloped southern and inland regions of Sudan.

Some sources describe the conflict as an ethnoreligious one where the Arab-Muslim central government's pursuits to impose Sharia law in 1983 on non-Muslim southerners led to violence, and eventually to the civil war. Historian Douglas Johnson has pointed to exploitative governance as the root cause.

When the British governed Sudan as a colony they administered the northern and southern provinces separately. The south was held to be more similar to the other East African colonies – Kenya, Tanganyika, and Uganda – while northern Sudan was more similar to Arabic-speaking Egypt. Northern Arabs were prevented from holding positions of power in the south with its African traditions, and trade was discouraged between the two areas. However, in 1946, the British gave in to northern pressure to integrate the two areas. Arabic was made the language of administration in the south, and northerners began to hold positions there. The southern elite, trained in English, resented the change as they were kept out of government. After decolonization most power was given to the northern elites based in Khartoum, causing unrest in the south. The British moved towards granting Sudan independence, but did not invite southern Sudanese leaders to participate in negotiations during the transitional period in the 1950s. In the post-colonial government of 1953, the Sudanization Committee had six southerners in its 800 senior administrative positions.

The second war was partially about natural resources. Between the north and the south lie significant oil fields and thus significant foreign interests (the oil revenue is privatized to Western interests as in Nigeria). The northerners wanted to control these resources because they live on the edge of the Sahara desert, which is unsuitable for agricultural development. Oil revenues make up about 70% of Sudan's export earnings. Due to the numerous tributaries of the Nile river and heavier precipitation in the south of Sudan, it has superior water access and more fertile land.

There has also been a significant amount of death from warring tribes in the south. Most of the conflict has been between Nuer and Dinka but other ethnic groups have also been involved. These tribal conflicts continued after South Sudanese independence.

The first civil war ended in 1972, with the Addis Ababa Agreement. Part of this agreement gave religious and cultural autonomy to the south. Despite this a number of mutinies by former Anyanya took place in 1974, 1975, and February 1976 with the March 1975 mutiny at Akobo seeing 200 killed, 150 soldiers executed, and 48 more sentenced to imprisonment for up to 15 years.

== Course of the war ==
=== Before 1985 ===
==== Addis Ababa Agreement ended ====
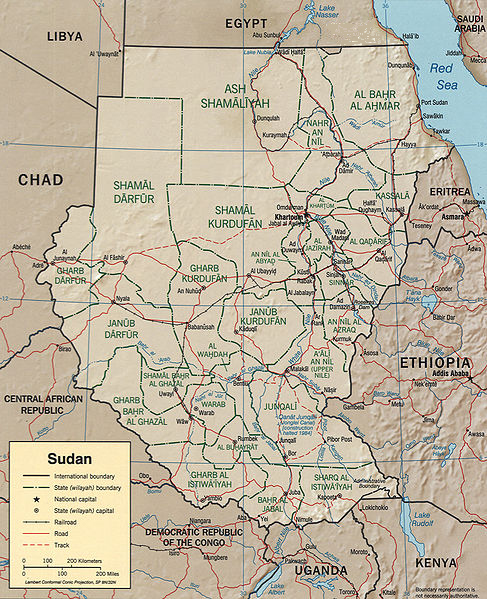
Map of Sudan at the time of the civil war

The accords of the Addis Ababa Agreement had been incorporated in the Constitution of Sudan; the violation of the agreement led to the second civil war.

The first violations occurred when President Gaafar Nimeiry attempted to take control of oil fields straddling the north–south border. Oil had been discovered in Bentiu in 1978, in southern Kordofan and Upper Blue Nile in 1979, the Unity oilfields in 1980 and Adar oilfields in 1981, and in Heglig in 1982. Access to the oil fields brought significant economic benefit to whoever controlled them.

Islamic fundamentalists in the north had been discontented with the Addis Ababa Agreement, which gave relative autonomy to the non-Islamic majority Southern Sudan Autonomous Region. The fundamentalists continued to grow in power, and in 1983 President Nimeiry declared all of Sudan an Islamic state, terminating the Southern Sudan Autonomous Region and starting the Second Sudanese Civil War.

==== Sudan People's Liberation Army (SPLA) ====
In May 1983, the 1st Division's 105th Battalion in the Sudanese military mutinied in the towns of Bor and Pibor. Government soldiers moved to suppress the mutiny but were repulsed by the rebels.

The Sudan People's Liberation Army (SPLA) was founded in 1983 as a rebel group, to reestablish an autonomous southern Sudan by fighting against the central government. While based in southern Sudan, it identified itself as a movement for all oppressed Sudanese citizens, and was led by John Garang. Initially, the SPLA campaigned for a united Sudan, criticizing the central government for policies that were leading to national "disintegration".

In September 1985 the Government of Sudan announced the end of the state of emergency and dismantled the emergency courts but soon promulgated a new judiciary act, which continued many of the practices of the emergency courts. Despite Nimeiry's public assurances that the rights of non-Muslims would be respected, southerners and other non-Muslims remained deeply suspicious.

=== 1985–1991 ===
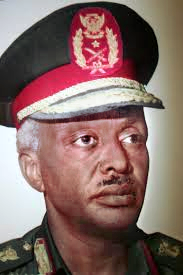
Abdel Rahman Suwar al-Dahab

On 6 April 1985, senior military officers led by General Abdel Rahman Swar al-Dahab mounted a coup. Among the first acts of the new government was to suspend the 1983 constitution, rescind the decree declaring Sudan's intent to become an Islamic state, and disband Nimeiry's Sudanese Socialist Union. However, the "September laws" instituting Islamic Sharia law were not suspended.

A 15-member transitional military council was named, chaired by al-Dahab, in 1985. In consultation with an informal conference of political parties, unions, and professional organizations—known as the "Gathering"—the military council appointed an interim civilian cabinet, headed by Prime Minister Dr. Al-Jazuli Daf'allah. Elections were held in April 1986, and the transitional military council turned over power to a civilian government as promised. The government was headed by Prime Minister Sadiq al-Mahdi of the Umma Party. It consisted of a coalition of the Umma Party, the Democratic Unionist Party (DUP) (formerly the National Unionist Party), the National Islamic Front (NIF) of Hassan al-Turabi, and several southern region parties. This coalition dissolved and reformed several times over the next few years, with Prime Minister Sadiq al-Mahdi and his Umma Party always in a central role.

==== Negotiation and escalation ====
In May 1986, the Sadiq al-Mahdi government coalition began peace negotiations with the SPLA led by Col. John Garang. In that year the SPLA and a number of Sudanese political parties met in Ethiopia and agreed to the "Koka Dam" declaration, which called for abolishing Islamic Sharia law and convening a constitutional conference. In 1988, the SPLA and the DUP agreed on a peace plan calling for the abolition of military pacts with Egypt and Libya, freezing of Sharia law, an end to the state of emergency, and a cease-fire. However, during this period the second civil war intensified in lethality, and the national economy continued to deteriorate. When prices of basic goods were increased in 1988, riots ensued, and the price increases were cancelled. When Prime Minister Sadiq al-Mahdi refused to approve a peace plan reached by the DUP and the SPLA in November 1988, the DUP left the government. The new government consisted essentially of the Umma Party and the Islamic fundamentalist NIF. In February 1989, the army presented Prime Minister Sadiq al-Mahdi with an ultimatum: he could move toward peace or be removed. He chose to form a new government with the DUP, and approved the SPLA/DUP peace plan. A constitutional conference was tentatively planned for September 1989.

==== Revolutionary Command Council for National Salvation ====
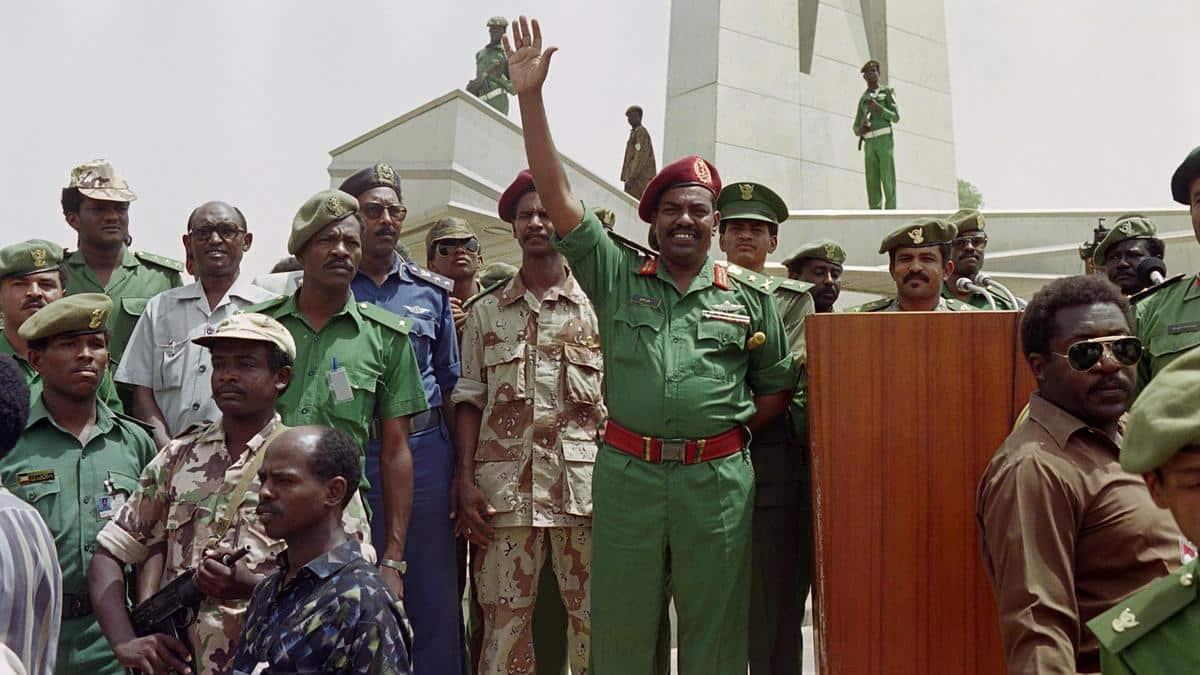
Omar al-Bashir (centre) and Abdel Rahim Mohammed Hussein (blue fatigue) in front of the Republican Palace after the coup

On 30 June 1989, however, military officers under Col. Omar Hassan al-Bashir, with alleged NIF instigation and support, replaced Sadiq al-Mahdi's government with the Revolutionary Command Council for National Salvation (RCC), a military junta of 15 military officers (reduced to 12 in 1991) assisted by a civilian cabinet. Now a General al-Bashir became: president, chief of state, prime minister, and chief of the armed forces.

The RCC banned trade unions, political parties, and other "non-religious" institutions. About 78,000 members of the army, police, and civil administration were purged in order to reshape the government.

==== Criminal Act of 1991 ====
In March 1991, a new penal code, the Criminal Act of 1991, instituted harsh punishments nationwide, including amputations and stoning. Although the southern states were officially exempt from these Islamic prohibitions and penalties, the 1991 act provided for a possible future application of Islamic Sharia law in the south. In 1993, the government transferred most non-Muslim judges from the south to the north, replacing them with Muslim judges in the south. The introduction of Public Order Police to enforce Sharia law resulted in the arrest, and treatment under Sharia penalties, of southerners and other non-Muslims living in the north.

=== Conduct of the war: 1991–2001 ===
The Sudan People's Liberation Army (SPLA) was in control of large areas of Equatoria, Bahr al Ghazal, and Upper Nile provinces and also operated in the southern portions of Darfur, Kordofan, and Blue Nile provinces. The government controlled a number of the major southern towns and cities, including Juba, Wau, and Malakal. An informal cease-fire in May broke down in October 1989.

In July 1992, a government offensive seized many parts of southern Sudan, and captured the SPLA headquarters in Torit.

Both the government regular armed forces and the Popular Defense Forces (PDF) were used to attack and raid villages in the south and in the Nuba Mountains. Sudan's governments have a long history of using proxies in southern Sudan, and the north–south border areas, to fight their wars and preserve their regular forces. These militias were recruited locally, and with covert ties to the national government. Many of the Khartoum-aligned groups were created and then armed by the NIF in a deliberate 'divide and rule' strategy.

Nuer White Army flag

The widespread activity of insurgent and pro-government militants and increasing lawlessness in southern Sudan resulted in the militarization of many communities. Ethnic violence became widespread, and all sides targeted civilians to destroy the power bases and recruitment centers of their rivals. Those who could formed self-defense groups, and these were often based on familial and tribal links as these were the only ones most southern people could still rely on. In this way, groups like the Nuer White Army and Dinka Titweng ("cattle guard") militias came into existence. Even though they were originally intended to just defend civilian communities, they often became brutal gangs which targeted civilians of other ethnicities. The government and rebel groups exploited these tensions and self-defense groups, using them to destabilize their enemies.

The Sudanese Armed Forces became infamous for brutally suppressing all civil dissidents. People suspected of disloyalty or rebel sympathies were arrested and taken to prisons and barracks, where they were tortured and executed. Hundreds, perhaps even thousands of people were murdered at the infamous "White House" – the Giada barracks in Juba – alone. At the same time, the SPLA ruthlessly crushed all internal and external opposition as far as possible, including other rebel factions such as the Anyanya II insurgents and critics in its own ranks. Garang became infamous for his authoritarian leadership style, and ordered the torture and execution of several dissenting SPLA commanders. Over time, a growing number of SPLA members became wary of his rule, and began to conspire against him.

==== SPLA infighting ====
In August 1991, internal dissent among the rebels led opponents of Garang's leadership, most importantly Riek Machar and Lam Akol, to attempt a coup against him. It failed, and the dissidents split off to form their own SPLA faction, the SPLA-Nasir. On 15 November 1991, Machar's SPLA-Nasir alongside the Nuer White Army carried out the Bor massacre, killing an estimated 2000 Dinka civilians. In September 1992, William Nyuon Bany formed a second rebel faction, and in February 1993, Kerubino Kuanyin Bol formed a third rebel faction. On 5 April 1993, the three dissident rebel factions announced a coalition of their groups called SPLA United at a press conference in Nairobi, Kenya.

==== Sudanese alignments ====
During 1990 and 1991, the Sudanese government supported Saddam Hussein in the Gulf War. This changed American attitudes toward the country. Bill Clinton's administration prohibited American investment in the country and supplied money to neighbouring countries to repel Sudanese incursions. The US also began attempts to "isolate" Sudan and began referring to it as a rogue state.

Since 1993, the leaders of Eritrea, Ethiopia, Uganda, and Kenya have pursued a peace initiative for Sudan under the auspices of the Intergovernmental Authority on Development (IGAD), but results have been mixed. Despite that record, the IGAD initiative promulgated the 1994 Declaration of Principles (DOP) that aimed to identify the essential elements necessary to a just and comprehensive peace settlement; i.e. the relationship between religion and the state, power-sharing, wealth-sharing, and the right of self-determination for the south. The Sudanese Government did not sign the DOP until 1997 after major battlefield losses to the SPLA.

==== SPLA alignments ====
In 1995, the opposition in the north united with parties from the south to create a coalition of opposition parties called the National Democratic Alliance (NDA). This development opened a northeastern front to the civil war, making it a Sudan wide conflict rather than simply a north–south conflict. The SPLA, DUP, and Umma Parties were the key groups forming the NDA, along with several smaller parties and northern ethnic groups.

In 1995, Eritrea, Ethiopia and Uganda stepped up their military assistance to the SPLA to the point of sending active troops into Sudan. Eritrean and Ethiopian military involvement weakened when the two countries entered a border conflict in 1998. Uganda's support weakened when it shifted its attention to the conflict in the Democratic Republic of Congo.

Movements in Operation Thunderbolt

By 1997, seven groups in the government camp, led by former Garang lieutenant Riek Machar, signed the Khartoum Peace Agreement with the NIF, thereby forming the largely symbolic South Sudan Defence Forces (SSDF) umbrella. Furthermore, the government signed the Nuba Mountains, and Fashoda agreements with rebel factions. These included the Khartoum agreements that ended military conflict between the government and significant rebel factions. Many of those leaders then moved to Khartoum where they assumed marginal roles in the central government, or collaborated with the government in military engagements against the SPLA. These three agreements paralleled the terms and conditions of the IGAD agreement, calling for a degree of autonomy for the south and the right of self-determination. Nevertheless, the SPLA made major advances in 1997 due to the success of Operation Thunderbolt, an offensive during which the southern Sudanese separatists seized most of Central and Western Equatoria from the government.

In July 2000, the Libyan/Egyptian Joint Initiative on the Sudan called for the establishment of an interim government, power-sharing, constitutional reform, and new elections. Southern critics objected to the joint initiative because it neglected to address issues of the relationship between religion and the state and failed to mention the right of self-determination. Some critics viewed it as more aimed at a resolution among northern political parties and protecting the perceived security interests of Egypt over the unity of Sudan.

=== Later operations and peace agreement of 2005 ===
Frontlines in Southern Sudan, June 2001

Peace talks between the southern rebels and the government made substantial progress in 2003 and early 2004, although skirmishes in parts of the south continued. A Comprehensive Peace Agreement was signed on 9 January 2005 in Nairobi. The terms of the peace treaty were:

- The south had autonomy for six years, followed by a referendum on independence (the 2011 South Sudanese independence referendum).
- Both sides of the conflict would have merged portions of their armed forces into a 39,000-strong force after six years (the Joint Integrated Units), if the southern Sudanese independence referendum had turned out against secession.
- Oil revenues were divided equally between the government and SPLA during the six-year autonomy period.
- Jobs were split according to varying ratios (central administration: 70 to 30, Abyei/Blue Nile State/Nuba Mountains: 55 to 45, both in favour of the government).
- Islamic Sharia law was applied in the north, while terms of use of Sharia in the south were decided by the elected assembly.

The status of three central and eastern provinces was a point of contention in the negotiations.

According to the SPLA, about 2 million people had died in southern Sudan alone due to the war.

Marking the twentieth anniversary of the agreement in January 2025, the governments of Norway, the United Kingdom, Germany, Canada, the Netherlands and the United States issued a joint statement saying the CPA's promise of lasting peace had "gone unfulfilled", pointing to South Sudan's continued instability, repeatedly postponed elections and ongoing humanitarian crisis.

== Impact ==
=== Economy ===
The Second Sudanese Civil War destroyed many sectors of economic activity. The sector with the most damage was the agriculture sector. The conflict forced many farmers to escape the violence and abandon their farmland. Agriculture projects that were meant to improve cultivation methods, some that were funded by the United Nations, were terminated because they were destroyed or people stopped working; such projects include a pump-irrigation system. Additionally, the "animal wealth" of the farmers significantly decreased. Over six million cows, two million sheep, and one million goats were killed during the war.

A different sector that was affected by the conflict was the industrial sector, which consists of manufacturing and processing. Manufacturing facilities were unable to produce essential materials, including soap, textiles, sugar, and processed foods. Processed-foods facilities include the preservation of foods, such as canning fruits and vegetables, and vegetable oil production.

Poverty continued to climb and significantly impacted people in rural areas. The destroyed agriculture sector was the primary source of income for about 8 out of 10 households. Living in a rural region is also associated with a lower quality of life because residents lack access to basic services and economic opportunities and job opportunities.

=== Infrastructure ===
Before the war, Sudan did not have a comprehensive infrastructure system; it lacked roads, bridges, and communications. The war led to the existing infrastructure being destroyed. Critical infrastructure, like waterways and canals, were destroyed by airstrikes.

=== Education ===
==== In Sudan ====
When Sudan entered war, education funding was reduced and reallocated to military and security forces. Sudan's military spending increased from 10 percent to 20 percent, while reducing spending on education and in other areas. Following the war, education was less likely to be funded, fewer educators were available due to death or injury, and education facilities were destroyed.

==== In South Sudan ====
As of 2015, 42 percent of South Sudan's budget was allocated to military and security expenditures. In the same year, only 35 percent of the teachers in South Sudan had a primary-level of education. An additional obstacles students face is the forced recruitment into armed militias and state military. According to a United Nations report, 50 percent of South Sudanese children do not attend school. Boys and girls, who are in schools, are abducted by soldiers and forced to join the military or armed rebel groups. When they are taken, most girls are raped by their captors and those who resist are killed. Boys are "castrated and sexually mutilated". According to a United Nations report, an estimated 430 children were victims of sexual violence through military recruitment in South Sudan. USAID continues to work on educational initiatives, including granting 9,000 scholarships to boys and girls. They also have over a dozen educational projects and have constructed 140 primary-level schools and four secondary schools. Over 1.4 million students attend or are involved in USAID educational programs in the region.

=== Environment ===
Historically, disputes in Sudan have been over fertile land and water. Oil became a point of dispute following its discovery in Sudan. However, despite the availability of oil, Sudan experiences the paradox of the plenty, a phenomenon that occurs when a country has plentiful natural resources—in this case, oil—but struggles to fully compete economically.

Because of displacement, refugees who fled their destroyed homes cut down forests to survive. They used the wood for fuel, building materials, and to find food.

=== People ===
==== Refugees and displacement ====
The war destroyed towns that were once centers of culture and economic activity. Much of the culture of the southern Sudanese was lost when they fled north as refugees. Tribes and groups that remained in the area fortified their claim on territory and entered into conflict with one another. Violence and instability during the conflict contributed to large scale displacement, with communal violence intensified and prolonged by wider political instability and regional crises.

Refugee flow continues well past 2012, when "South Sudan–Sudan: State of Emergency" was published. Tensions between the North Sudanese government and the SPLA continued decades after the first wave of displaced peoples fled from South Sudan. Refugees who relocated to other parts of South Sudan soon after faced threats of violence and oftentimes became displaced again.

The continuity of violence across South Sudan has defined the attitudes of South Sudanese living in Khartoum. A University of Khartoum article describes these displaced people as "angry, sad, and disappointed" with the status of South Sudan. The author describes the South Sudanese people as "transnational" and "diasporic"; referring to how widespread displaced people moved as a result of the Second Sudanese Civil War.

By the end of the war, four million people in southern Sudan were displaced at least once, normally repeatedly during the war.

==== Women's experience ====
During the war, women were heavily supporting the communities and people impacted by the war. Women organized food drives, cooked meals, delivered supplies, cared for the wounded, parented orphans, and assisted the elderly. While male-leaders limited the type of work women to traditional societal roles, the male-leaders promised to change the gender relations during peacetime and after the war.

When the war ended, women engaged in their own organizing, coalition-building, and advocacy—as they had done during the civil war. Women advocated for social change and issues directly impacting women, such as "sexual and gender-based abuse", education, healthcare, and "access to law and justice". The increased political involvement enabled the Government of South Sudan to implement an affirmative action policy, in which 25 percent of representation in all levels of government must be allocated to women. Women involved in state affairs led to the founding of multiple advocacy organizations, including the South Sudanese Women Empowerment Network and South Sudanese Women United. These groups have projects around the world, including the United States.

== Foreign involvement ==
=== Alleged complicity in war crimes ===
==== Canada ====
In 2000, diplomat John Harker filed a detailed report showing Talisman company's (then led by Jim Buckee) complicity in the country's civil war. The report includes royalties flowing to the Sudanese government and negligence through allowing the military to use an airstrip meant for only oil-related traffic, leading to attacks on civilians. A protest led by the United church of Canada, including other Calgary churches called for a moratorium on oil until the civil war ended. The company was then sold in 2002. Aid workers claimed that Talisman used their royalties to finance weapons for the war, but Talisman denied claims, saying the royalties were re-invested into building infrastructure for the country. Since then, Canada has not formally sanctioned the company.

==== Sweden ====
Two former executives of Lundin Oil, Ian Lundin and Alex Schneiter are set for in Sweden aiding and abetting war crimes between 1999 and 2003. It is alleged that the executives asked the Sudanese government to use its forces to act as security at one of their fields, leading to attacks on civilians.

=== Foreign interventions ===
In 1999, Egypt and Libya initiated the Egypt-Libya Initiative (ELI). By this time the peace process of the Inter-Governmental Authority on Drought and Development (IGADD) had reached a stalemate. The ELI's main purpose had been to bring members of the non-southern opposition (especially opposition in the north) aboard the talks. However, as the ELI avoided contentious issues, such as secession, it lacked support from the SPLA, but the NDA leadership accepted it. By 2001, the ELI had been unable to bring about any agreement between the parties.

In September 2001, former U.S. Senator John Danforth was appointed Special Envoy to the Sudan. His role was to explore the prospects of the US playing a role in ending Sudan's civil war and to enhance humanitarian services delivery that could help reduce the suffering of the Sudanese people.

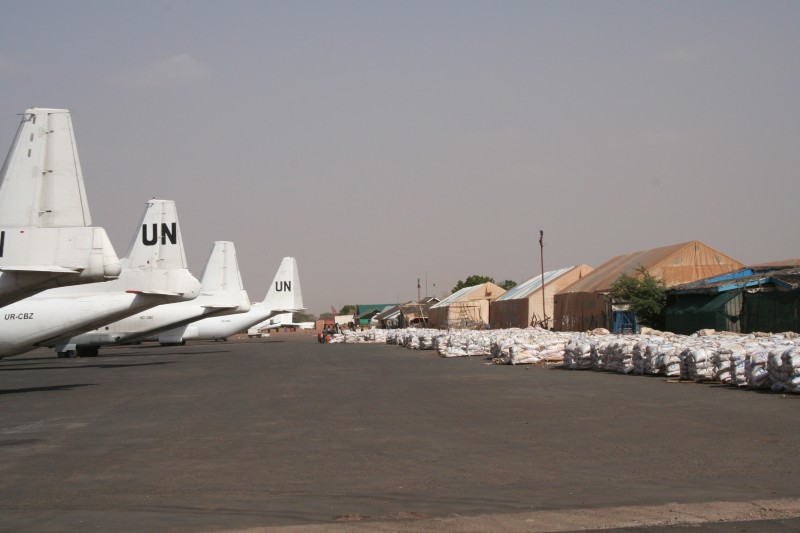
Planes used by Operation Lifeline Sudan to airdrop humanitarian aid

In March 1989, following internal outcry, the government of Sadiq al-Mahdi agreed with the United Nations and donor nations (including the US) on a plan called Operation Lifeline Sudan (OLS), under which some 100,000 tons of food was moved into both government and SPLA-held areas of Sudan. The OLS helped avert widespread starvation. In 1990 Sudan faced the start of a 2-year drought and food shortage, leading to Phase II of the OLS being approved by both the Government of Sudan and the SPLA. The US, UN, and other donors attempted to mount a coordinated international relief effort in both north and south Sudan to prevent a catastrophe. However, due to Sudan's human rights abuses and its pro-Iraqi stance during the Gulf War, many donors cut much of their aid to the Sudan. In a similar drought in 2000 and 2001, the international community again attempted to avert mass starvation in Sudan.

The US government's Sudan Peace Act of 21 October 2002 accused Sudan of genocide for killing more than 2 million civilians in the south during the civil war since 1983.

== Arms suppliers ==
Prior to the start of the war, the United States had been a major supplier of arms to Sudan but after the start of the war, American assistance dropped, and was eventually cancelled in 1987.

During the 1980s, East Germany supplied the SPLA with AK-47s.

In November 1993, Iran was reported to have financed Sudan's purchase of some 20 Chinese ground-attack aircraft. Iran pledged $17 million in financial aid to the Sudanese government, and arranged for $300 million in Chinese arms to be delivered to the Sudanese army.

Meanwhile, the rebel SPLA was supplied weapons via Eritrea, Ethiopia, and Uganda. The Israeli embassy in Kenya also supplied anti-tank missiles to the rebels.

== Human rights abuses ==
Human Rights Watch published an extensive report in June 1994, detailing human rights abuses by all parties during the war in Southern Sudan, including the government and the various factions of the SPLA. These included, among others, by the government: summary executions and disappearances (including civilians and international aid employees), arrests, and mass displacement; government execution and disappearance; forcible displacement of civilians into inadequate conditions; and indiscriminate bombing. It also reports SPLA violations of the rules of war, including attacks, raids, and village burnings by both SPLA-Torit and SPLA-Nasir. There was forced recruitment of not only adults, but also child soldiers; arbitrary detention; torture; disappearances; and stealing food and looting from civilians. At the end of the war, there was lack of due process as well as inadequate investigations and accountability for the abuses.

=== Killing of foreign workers ===
In late 1992, during William Nyuon Bany's Defection from SPLA-Torit to join SPLA-Nasir, and related battles in Equatoria, three foreign humanitarian aid workers and a Norwegian journalist were killed by gunfire. Each SPLA faction blamed the other. Their deaths have never been fully explained, nor have the killers been held accountable. The UN did not make its investigation public. In December 1992, John Garang admitted that his own forces "might" have been responsible; however, an alternative theory putting the blame on Nyuon's forces has not been completely discarded.

=== Child soldiers ===
Armies from all sides enlisted children in their ranks. The 2005 agreement required that child soldiers be demobilized and sent home. The SPLA claimed to have let go 16,000 of its child soldiers between 2001 and 2004. However, international observers (UN and Global Report 2004) have found demobilized children have often been re-recruited by the SPLA. As of 2004, there were between 2,500 and 5,000 children serving in the SPLA. The SPLA promised to demobilize all children by the end of 2010.

The Nuer White Army, a minor participant in the war in the Greater Upper Nile region, consisted largely of armed Nuer youths, but it was principally self-organised and often operated autonomously of both elders' authority and the dictates of the major factions.

==== Child soldiers in books ====
In the late 1980s, the Second Sudanese Civil War uprooted around 20,000 South Sudanese boys. They walked thousands of miles through Ethiopia to the Kakuma refugee camp in Kenya. Some estimates claim that nearly half of the refugees died along the way due to starvation, dehydration and disease. Once in Kenya, the South Sudanese refugees were accepted into various foreign countries, roughly 4,000 of whom came to the United States. These 4,000 young men pursued higher education and eventually became scholars and authors in their own rights. In 2004, James Disco and Susan Clark created the graphic novel "Echoes of the Lost Boys of Sudan", which tells the story of four South Sudanese young men as they integrate into American society.

In 2006, Dave Eggers published What Is the What, a fictional autobiography written from the perspective of Valentino Achak Deng. Valentino Achak Deng is a fictionalized South Sudanese refugee that came to the United States under the Lost Boys of Sudan programs.

Emmanuel Jal's autobiography War Child: A Child Soldier's Story revolves around Jal's experience as a child soldier during the civil war. It also reveals the internal conflicts of the SPLA that are overlooked.

=== Revival of slavery ===
During the war the Sudanese Armed Forces revived the use of enslavement as a weapon against the south, and particularly Christian prisoners of war, on the basis that Islamic law purportedly allowed it.

Muraheleen, armed Baggara herders, were enlisted as militia by the Sudanese government as a low-cost part of its counterinsurgency war against the rebel Sudan People's Liberation Movement/Army (SPLM/A), which was identified with the Dinka tribe of southern Sudan. These militias often destroyed Christian villages, executed all their males and then took the women and children as slaves. The first slave raid on the Dinka took place in February 1986. Two thousand women and children were taken. In a second raid, in February 1987, one thousand women and children were taken. Once the raiders acquired enough booty they would distribute the captives between themselves and their families. The raids continued every year after.

Dinka girls kept in northern Sudanese households were used as sex slaves. Some of them were sold in Libya. Western visitors noted that at slave markets, five or even more slaves could be bought for one rifle. Near the peak of the civil war in 1989, female black slaves were sold for 90 dollars at the slave markets. Several years later, the price of an average female black slave had dropped to $15. Many Western organisations traveled to Sudan with funds to purchase and emancipate these enslaved captives.

== See also ==
- Lost Boys of Sudan
- Lost Boys of Sudan (film)
- They Poured Fire on Us From the Sky
- A Long Walk to Water
- Operation Infinite Reach
