= Battle of Romic =

2020 battle between South Sudanese and forces and Luanyjang gelweng

Date	August 8–9, 2020
Location	Romic and surrounding villages, Tonj East County, Warrap State, South Sudan
Result	Luanyjang gelweng victory

Belligerents
SSPDF	Luanyjang gelweng

Commanders and leaders
Bol Akot Bol	Unknown

Casualties and losses
63 killed, 31+ injured	Heavy
- 85+ killed

Between August 8 and 9, 2020, clashes broke out between soldiers of the South Sudan People's Defence Forces (SSPDF) and Luanyjang gelweng in Romic, Tonj East, Warrap State, South Sudan during a disarmament process outlined in the peace process after the South Sudanese Civil War.

== Background ==
Following South Sudanese independence in 2011, tensions rose between Dinka President Salva Kiir and Nuer vice-president Riek Machar. These tensions grew into a civil war between Kiir's SSPDF (the official South Sudanese Army) and Machar's pre-independence militia Sudan People's Liberation Movement-in-Opposition (SPLM-IO), and quickly spread across various ethnic and religious militias across South Sudan. In 2018, Machar and Kiir finally signed a peace agreement dubbed the R-ARCSS between South Sudanese opposition movements and the South Sudanese government, but this was not implemented until 2019.

In 2020, ethnic violence largely de-escalated across South Sudan as a result of the peace agreement and the implementation of a United Nations arms embargo on the country. However, guns were being imported into the country and to all actors in the conflict despite the embargo, being used in war crimes and stockpiling. Amnesty International investigators also discovered that the disarmament process delineated by the UN was seldom occurring.

Despite the peace agreement, wars continued across various groups in Tonj East County, Tonj North County, Tonj South County, and Tonj city in Warrap state. Most of Warrap state is ethnically Dinka, but inter-ethnic feuds and clan warfare is prominent in Warrap state between Dinka. In Tonj East, the Rek Dinka share territory with the Luanyjang Dinka, who are a minority. Historically, Luanyjang had been raided by the larger Rek Dinka during disarmament campaigns of the Second Sudanese Civil War. After Akol Koor Kuc, a former ally of Kiir who used his loyalism to become head of and bolster South Sudan's National Security Services (NSS) fell on bad terms with Kiir, Kiir appointed Bona Panek, an opponent of Kuc, as governor of Warrap State. Panek then launched a disarmament campaign in Warrap state, although this was mainly to take arms from Kuc and his supporters, which included Luanyjang areas of Tonj East.

Rek Dinka commander Bol Akot Bol established a post in Romic, the capital of Tonj East, in late July 2020 in preparation for the disarmament campaign. Around this time, Rek Dinka had begun grazing in Luanyjang areas, so Luanyjang feared that with no weapons, they would be defenseless against possible raids by Rek Dinka over cattle.

== Clashes ==
On August 8, 2020, SSPDF under Bol shot an unarmed man at the market in Romic during disarmament. The shooting occurred following an argument over a red bandana in the market, and the man's refusal to give SSPDF soldiers his bandana. Violence broke out between the SSPDF and Luanyjang civilians at the market, with shops being ransacked and looted and the market eventually being burned down.

The shooting of the unarmed man spurred Luanyjang gelweng, or militias, to attack the SSPDF base in Romic on the night between August 8 and 9. The base was attacked during the night, incurring heavy casualties for the SSPDF. Gelweng attacked the base a second time that morning, overrunning the base and killing more SSPDF soldiers. SSPDF forces used tanks and other weapons against cattle camps and villages surrounding Romic. Gelweng on the ground operated independently of the county commissioner and Luanyjang authorities, giving them popularity as a fighting force among Luanyjang residents.

== Aftermath ==
SSPDF officials asked Luanyjang authorities to identify the leaders of the gelweng in the immediate aftermath of the clashes. United Nations peacekeepers on August 14 conducted an air patrol over Romic and surrounding villages alongside Bol, and also established a temporary base in Romic to ensure stability. At least sixty-three soldiers and eighty-five civilians were killed during the clashes, and locals estimated that at least 150 people had been killed on both sides. At least thirty-one soldiers were injured in the clashes as well. Several tanks were abandoned in Romic as well.

Bol quit the disarmament campaign in Tonj East in late August due to public embarrassment over the heavy losses incurred by the SSPDF in Romic. However, he enforced a siege on humanitarian materials in Tonj East, forbidding them from entering the county until he was sacked in 2021.
