= Tonj River =

- Location within South Sudan

Location
- Country: South Sudan

Physical characteristics
- Mouth: Bahr el Ghazal River
  - coordinates: 8.254930°N 29.502146°E

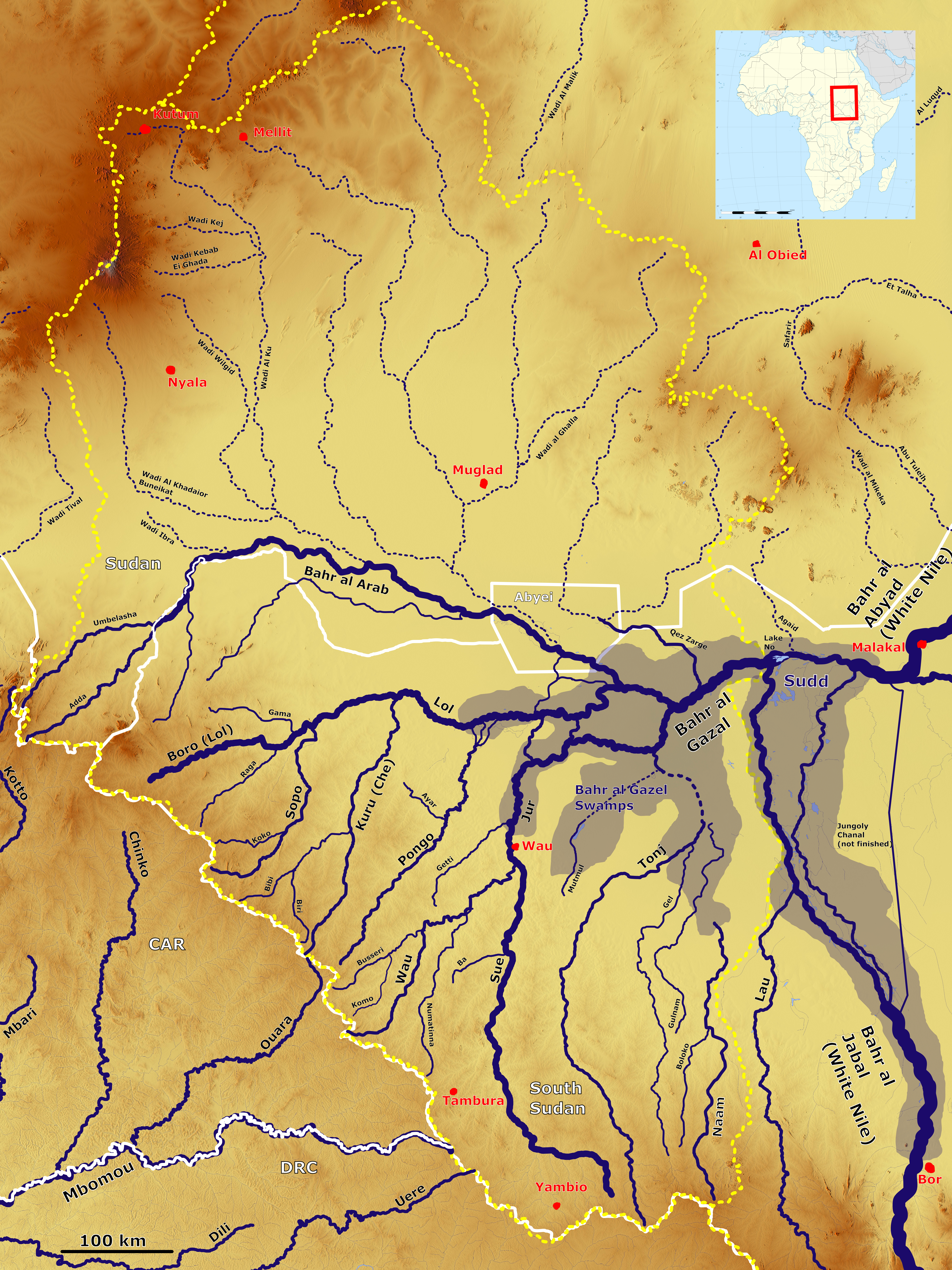
Tonj river seen as a tributary of Bahr al Gazal river

The Tonj River, also called the Ibba River or Nyatt Ayok, is a river of South Sudan. It is a right tributary of the Bahr el Ghazal River.

== Course ==
The Tonj River is a tributary of the Bahr el Ghazal River. (Note: The tributaries of Bahr el Ghazal from east to west are Gel (or Tapari), Yei (or Lau), Naam, Meridi (or Gel), Ibba (or Tonj), Jur, Lol and the Bahr al-Arab.) The river originates in the south of the states of Western Equatoria not far from the border with Haut-Uélé in the Democratic Republic of the Congo. It flows north from Western Equatoria through Tonj South County in Warrap into Unity State. The central part of the river flows through the Southern National Park. About the end of March this section is liable to be swollen by the early rains and cannot be forded by a motor vehicle. After entering Warrap it passes the town of Tonj. The river enters the Bahr el-Ghazal just north of Wancual airport.

== Hydrology ==
The Tonj (or Ibba) drains a basin of 27,000 square kilometres (10,000 sq mi). Mean annual rainfall is 1,220 millimetres (48 in). At the town of Tonj the trough has a width of 70 metres (230 ft) and maximum depth of 3 metres (9.8 ft), with a maximum discharge is 100 cubic metres per second (3,500 cu ft/s).

== Environment ==
The river is thickly forested in its upper valley, but further down there are strips of grass plain on either side and eventually, the forest gives way to an open grassy plain. The river winds through a flood plain that gradually widens in its lower reaches. To the north of Tonj, the river enters a large lagoon from which several small watercourses lead into a grass swamp. Each year Warrap experiences flood from July to December, with some parts being totally isolated.

== Sources ==
- Anderson, A. B. (1949), "The Sudan's Southern National Park." (PDF), African Wild Life, 3 (1): 24–29, 55
- Hurst, Harold Edwin; Phillips, P.; Black, R. P. (1931), The Nile Basin, Government Press
- "Node: Tonj (241883142)", OpenStreetMap
- Shahin, M.M.A. (1 January 1985), Hydrology of the Nile Basin, Elsevier, ISBN 978-0-08-088756-2
- State Report Warrap (PDF), International Organization for Migration (IOM), 2009
- Unity State - Detailed Transport Map January 2013 (PDF), ReliefWeb
