= Gatdeang Dit =

Nuer prophet (d. 2018)

- Gatdeang in 2003
- Born: Mut Turoah Nyaweah
- Died: 20 December 2018
- Occupation: Prophet
- Years active: 1960s–2018
- Spouses: over 60
- Relatives: Matthew Puljang Top (nephew); Taban Deng Gai (son-in-law)

Gatdeang Dit (born Mut Turoah Nyaweah; d. 2018 (Note: Gatdeang's birthdate is inconsistent in the sources. Nyamilepedia states that the prophet was born in 1933. But Hutchinson and Pendle, writing in 2015, state that he was then in his sixties, and Tubiana, also writing in 2015, states that the prophet was about 70, implying a birthdate in the 1940s.)), known among the western Dinka as Deng Loth or Gader, was a Bul Nuer prophet (Note: Nuer prophets (Nuer: sing. guk or guan kuoth, pl. guaan kuthni, meaning "owners of [a] divinity") are spiritual leaders among the Nuer, claiming to have control of various divine powers. They arose during the latter half of the 19th century.) of the deity Deng. (Note: Deng is a Nuer and Dinka deity, associated with lightning, rain and coolness. That final quality is connected to wishes for health, fertility, kindness, peace and prosperity, among other things.) Emerging as a prophet during the 1960s, he had become established as a religious leader by the 1980s, when he roused Bul Nuer youth to defend themselves against Baggara Arabs. The prophet moved to Mayom County in 2000. Thousands of his cattle were raided in 2008, which prompted Salva Kiir, then the First Vice President of Sudan, to assuage the prophet. Sudan People's Liberation Army (SPLA) forces attacked Gatdeang in 2010, where the prophet was uninjured after being shot at at least eight times, and again in 2014. In 2016, he served as one of the leaders of the peace agreement made in the town of Mayen Jur. The prophet died on 20th December, 2018, of cancer.

Gatdeang was best known for rainmaking and peacemaking. The prophet taught that Deng approved of defensive but not offensive lethal violence; preaching against retaliatory raids and Nuer-Dinka conflict. By his final years, he had become the most famous western Nuer prophet, as well as the richest person and the most powerful spiritual leader in South Sudan's Unity State. This influence was gained through gifts of cattle for his blessings, and the familial connections and bridewealth brought through the marriage of his daughters.

== Name ==
The name Gatdeang Dit, also spelled Gatdeng Dit, is theophoric, literally meaning "Son of the great [god] Deng". The prophet was born with the name Mut Turoah Nyaweah, and was also known as Mut Turoah Nyaweah Nhial and Mut Turoah Nyaweah Nhial Luom. Nyaweah may also be spelled Nyaweach, Nyewei, Nyawey, or Nyawei. He was called Deng Loth or Gader by the western Dinka.

== Biography ==
=== Early life and Second Sudanese Civil War ===
Following his father's death, in the 1960s, Gatdeang became a prophet of Deng. He inherited the deity through his father and paternal grandfather, both of whom were also prophets of Deng. By the mid-1980s, amidst the Second Sudanese Civil War, Gatdeang had become an established spiritual leader and rainmaker. Using his spiritual authority, he urged Bul Nuer men to avoid infighting and to defend themselves against Baggara Arab raiders, who had been ordered by the Sudanese government to remove the Nuer and Dinka living in oil-producing areas in the Western Upper Nile. He also blessed the Arabs and unsuccessfully asked them to not fight.

In 1997, the prophet was visited by local Dinka leaders who sought his rainmaking abilities during a severe drought. Gatdeang didn't acknowledge these visitors, and instead reported them to the South Sudan Independence Army (SSIA), which accused them of espionage on behalf of the SPLA and arrested them. Four of the leaders were killed, while the rest were detained for months. The survivors were frustrated, though they understood the prophet to have only meant to prevent the SSIA from harming him. In a meeting preceding the 1999 Wunlit Peace Conference, according to the Dinka chief Morris Ngor Ater, he and other Dinka chiefs established a long-lasting peace with Gatdeang to prevent cattle raiding.

=== In Mayom County ===
Gatdeang moved to Koani, Mayom County in 2000. In 2006, he was gifted a drum as an offering for Deng by Peter Gatdet. In 2008, Dinka youth from Warrap State raided 2000–3000 cattle from the prophet's cattle camp. His followers planned to retaliate, but Gatdeang discouraged them, suggesting that the cattle will eventually be brought back, as he often received gifts of cattle from notable Dinka of Warrap. Salva Kiir, then the First Vice President of Sudan, visited the prophet a few months later in order to assuage him ahead of the upcoming elections and the independence referendum. However, Gatdeang refused the return of his cattle and suggested that Kiir take the rest of the prophet's calves. This reframed the raided cattle as a gift. Upon returning to Juba, Kiir sent 10 armed policemen to serve as Gatdeang's personal guard, as well as 2 battalions of the SPLA to protect the prophet's community; though the battalions were later withdrawn.

Two years later, Gatdeang was attacked by non-Bul SPLA forces, who were attempting to disarm cattle-camps belonging to the Bul Nuer at the orders of Taban Deng Gai, the recently re-elected (Note: According to The Carter Center, the election was fraught with intimidation and violence against voters, polling staff and party officials. Taban Deng was announced as the winner before the National Election Commission had declared the results of the election.) governor of Unity State and son-in-law of the prophet. One of Gatdeang's sons was injured and he himself was left with eight bullet holes in his clothing, but was not hurt. Angelina Teny, who had recently failed to become the governor of Unity State, condemned the attack. Learning of the incident, the commander Matthew Puljang Top, who is the prophet's nephew, moved with his troops to the latter's cattle-camp without orders, resulting in conflict between Puljang and the SPLA. Other commanders also rebelled due to the attack. In 2012, Gatdeang donated cows to fund the construction of schools. In 2014, after a clash with rebels, government forces again attacked the prophet, killing five of his sons, and rustling some of his cattle. This led Puljang to rebel once more. In 2015, Gatdeang opined on the South Sudanese Civil War, saying that he would not take sides, and that he wished for peace.

=== Peace of Mayen Jur ===
In 2016, Gatdeang and the Dinka bany e bith (Note: Baany e biith are spiritual leaders among the Dinka. They are seen as authorities in peace-making.) Mangong Madut were invited by Puljang and Gum Makuac, the governor of the nascent Gogrial State, in order to make peace in Mayen Jur after war in the area since the 1990s. This was after Puljang and Gum had failed to convince the local communities to accept elite peace agreements. The prophet and the bany e bith were joined by two other baany e biith and government officials when they met in Mayen Jur. Gatdeang and Madut sought to reassert traditional rules regarding violent conflict at this meeting.

One major topic raised by the prophet and the bany e bith at the meeting was raiding conducted during dawn, which led to the killing of women and children, and encouraged further feuding. For this reason, the activity was traditionally avoided. The two strongly demanded the cease of dawn raiding. Another topic was the status of wives in inter-ethnic marriages who had run away back to their fathers across ethnic lines due to their fear of being targeted as part of inter-ethnic revenge. Traditionally, this would require the father to return the bride-price to the husband, which had not been done. Therefore, the two had the wives return to their husbands along with any children they had, a decision which was seen as unjust by many. Finally, the meeting set up a court, intended to provide a peaceful means and to prevent violent means of inter-ethnic redress. Gatdeang would sit on this court, among others, until his death.

=== Death and legacy ===
In August 2018, Gatdeang was admitted to Freedom International Hospital in Juba, for what was later revealed to be cancer. He was then sent to Khartoum for treatment, but returned after doctors realised the disease was in a late stage. The prophet died in Mayom on 20th December 2018 due to the disease. His funeral was conducted on 30th January, 2019, in Ruadh Nyibol, Mayom County.

A memorial event was held in Juba on the first anniversary of Gatdeang's death. His demise would contribute to the return of war in Mayen Jur. Garang Mut Turoah, one of the prophet's sons, would succeed him in encouraging peace between feuding communities in northern South Sudan.

== Views, teachings and activities ==
Gatdeang taught that only defensive violence is acceptable to Deng; that the deity is angered by offensive violence. He discouraged armed Nuer youth from raiding the cattle of Baggara Arabs or Dinka, and told his followers to be neutral in the 2013 split in the South Sudanese government. He described modern weapons as having turned cattle raiding into war. As a prophet of the divinity Deng, who is associated with rain, Gatdeang was often sought in order to bring rain, being visited by large numbers of Dinka over his lifetime. He imparted the blessings of Deng through the symbol of water falling from his hand. He also advocated for belief in Christianity and helped establish a Catholic church in his hometown.

Gatdeang had become the most eminent western Nuer prophet by 2015; being known as a rainmaker and peacemaker as far as the Nuer in Ethiopia and Dinka in Rumbek. He was the most powerful religious leader as well as the richest person in South Sudan's Unity state, and had been approached for advice by notables such as Riek Machar and Salva Kiir. He accrued his wealth and influence through cattle gifted to him for his blessings, as well as through marrying his daughters to powerful men in South Sudan and the bride-wealth that provided to him. These marriages gained him kinship with high-ranking members of both the SPLA and the Sudan People's Liberation Movement-in-Opposition. Additionally, he was recorded in 2015 to have over 60 wives, 30 of which were Dinka. The prophet also sustained a formal friendship with Paulino Matip, in which both gifted to the other one of the cows gained from bridewealth for each marriage of their daughters.

The anthropologists Sharon Hutchinson and Naomi Pendle have compared and contrasted Gatdeang with Nyachol, a Nuer prophetess of the god Maani. They consider both the prophets to provide peace, but with different strategies. In their view, Gatdeang does not rely on offensive killing or Nuer-Dinka animosity, unlike Nyachol. Both the prophets have provided their followers with greater certainty, expanded their communities' settlements into former Dinka territory abandoned during the civil war, and attempted to curtail secularisation.

== Works cited ==
- "New Twist After SPLA Victory in Mayom County". AllAfrica. 10 January 2014 – via ProQuest.
- "Prominent Nuer spiritual leader undergoes operation in Juba". Nyamilepedia. 4 August 2018.
- "Popular Nuer spiritual leader Gatdeng dies in Mayom aged 85". Nyamilepedia. 20 December 2018.
- "40th-day Memorial service for Nuer spiritual leader to be conducted next week – family". Nyamilepedia. 25 January 2019.
- "First anniversary of popular Nuer spiritual leader's demise takes place Saturday in Juba – family". Nyamilepedia. 17 December 2019.
- "Governor Manytuil waging 'war' at us, family of late spiritual leader says". Sudans Post. Bentiu. 22 February 2022.
- "Angelina raises concerns about humanitarian situation in Unity state". Sudan Tribune. Juba. 2 May 2010.
- "Government troops clashes themselves as some abused human right violation in fighting rebels areas". Sudan Tribune. Bentiu. 9 January 2014.
- Final Report: Observing Sudan’s 2010 National Elections, April 11–18, 2010 (Report). The Carter Center. 14 December 2010.
- Athuai Wol, Wol (28 February 2019). "'A death of a civilian is better than that of a soldier': remembering the struggle for South Sudan, and living in it now". Conflict and Civicness Research Blog. London School of Economics and Political Science.
- Craze, Joshua; Tubiana, Jérôme; Gramizzi, Claudio (December 2016). A State of Disunity: Conflict Dynamics in Unity State, 2013–15 (HSBA Working Paper 42) (Report). Geneva: Small Arms Survey.
- da Costa, Diana Felix; Pendle, Naomi; Tubiana, Jérôme (2022). "'What is happening now is not raiding, it's war': The growing politicisation and militarisation of cattle-raiding among the Western Nuer and Murle during South Sudan's civil wars". Routledge Handbook of the Horn of Africa. Routledge. p. 224-237.
- Evans-Pritchard, E. E. (1951). "Some Features of Nuer Religion". The Journal of the Royal Anthropological Institute of Great Britain and Ireland. 81 (1). Royal Anthropological Institute of Great Britain and Ireland: 1–13.
- Hutchinson, Sharon E.; Pendle, Naomi R. (21 July 2015). "Violence, legitimacy, and prophecy: Nuer struggles with uncertainty in South Sudan". American Ethnologist. 42 (3). Wiley: 415–430. doi:10.1111/amet.12138. JSTOR 43867979.
- Jok, Jok Madut; Hutchinson, Sharon (September 1999). "Sudan's Prolonged Second Civil War and The Militarization of Nuer and Dinka Ethnic Identities". African Studies Review. 42 (2). African Studies Association: 125–145. doi:10.2307/525368.
- Pendle, Naomi Ruth (April 2023). Spiritual Contestations – The Violence of Peace in South Sudan. Religion in Transforming Africa. Vol. 12. Boydell & Brewer. ISBN 9781847013385. JSTOR jj.9192210.
- Ryle, John; Johnson, Douglas H., eds. (2021). What Happened at Wunlit?: An oral history of the 1999 Wunlit Peace Conference (Report). Rift Valley Institute.
- Taban Kuich, Bonifacio (30 August 2012). "Unity State: Elders in Bentiu contribute 30 cows for construction of schools". Sudan Tribune. Bentiu.
- Terry, Fiona; McQuinn, Brian (12 June 2018). The Roots of Restraint in War (PDF) (Report). International Committee of the Red Cross.
- Tubiana, Jérôme (13 July 2015). "Cattle-Camp Politics". Foreign Affairs.
