= Gogrial =

Gogrial Gakrial
- Town
- Nickname: Pana Akuoldit
- Location in South Sudan
- Coordinates: 8°31′48″N 28°06′00″E
- Country: South Sudan
- Region: Bahr el Ghazal
- State: Warrap State
- County: Gogrial West County
- Elevation: 1,302 ft (397 m)

Population (2011 Estimate)
  - Total: 44,600
- Time zone: UTC+2 (CAT)

Gogrial (also rendered and romanized in Arabic as Qaqriyal) is a town in South Sudan.

== Location ==
Gogrial is located in the Gogrial West County of Warrap State, in the Bahr el Ghazal region of South Sudan, close to the border with the Sudan and the Abyei region. This town is around 700 kilometres (430 mi), by road, northwest of Juba.

== Overview ==
Gogrial, like most South Sudanese towns, sits on a riverbank. The Jur River flows north, then turns east, about 5 kilometres (3.1 mi) to the east of the central business district of the town. This town is one of two places where former National Basketball Association player Manute Bol was reported to have been born, with some reports saying he was actually born in Turalei, where his remains were buried. It is also the birthplace of Salva Kiir, the first and current president of South Sudan.

== Population ==
As of July 2011, the exact population of Gogrial is not known. However, it is estimated that the human population within a radius of 7 kilometres (4.3 mi), from the center of town, is approximately 44,600.

== Points of interest ==
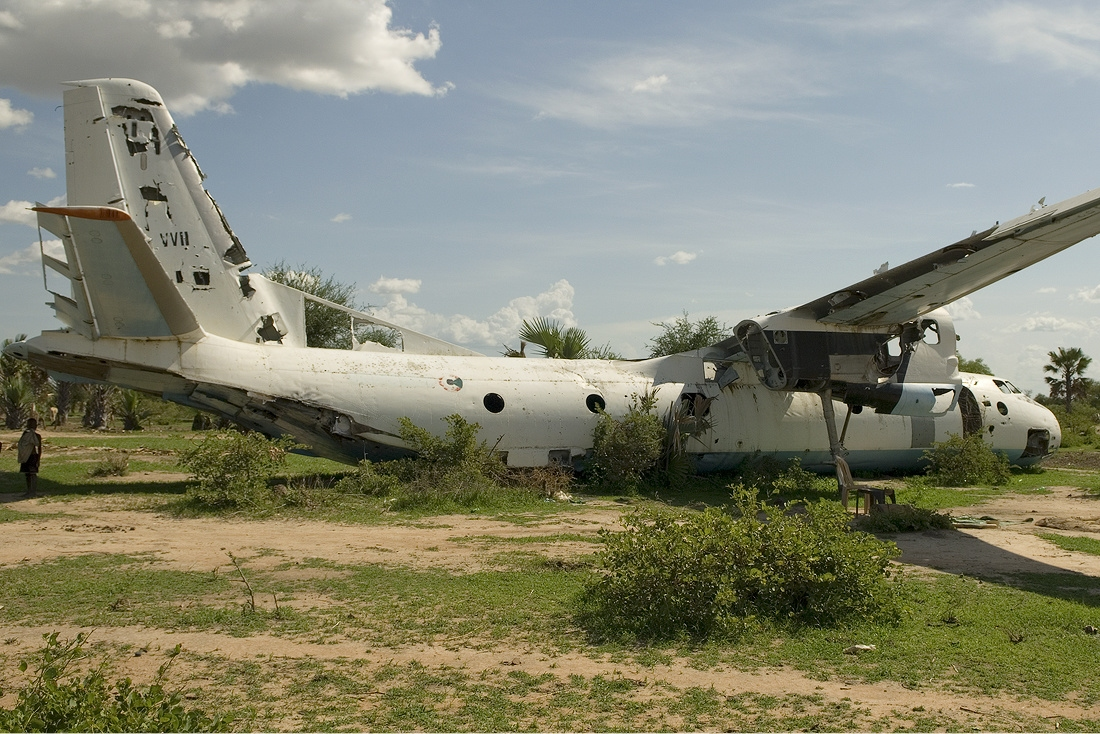
Sudan Air Force Antonov An-26-100. 7711 (cn 81–09) This an-26 crash-landed in 1997 at the airstrip of Gogrial. The plane got hit by SPLA-fire and had to make an emergency landing. Antonovs were used in the Sudanese Civil War as bombers and were feared by the population of Southern Sudan. 'VVll' is Arabic for '7711', which is written in Western-style numbers on the port-side.

The points of interest in or near the town of Gogrial include the following:

- Jur River - The river passes to the east of the town
- Gogrial Airport - A small civilian airport, with a single unpaved runway
- The main road from Wau, South Sudan to Babanusa, Sudan (B38) passes thorough Gogrial in a north to south direction
- The town of Kuajok - The capital of Warrap State, lies approximately 34 kilometres (21 mi), south of Gogrial, along Highway B38

== See also ==
- Bahr el Ghazal
- Gogrial Airport
