= Gogrial State =

State of South Sudan from 2015 to 2020

Gorgial Gogrial Akuol Akuith
- State
- Location of Gogrial State within South Sudan
- Country: South Sudan
- Capital: Kuajok
- Number of Counties: 5

Population (2014 Estimate)
  - Total: 462,480

Gogrial State was a state in South Sudan that existed between 2 October 2015 and 22 February 2020. It was located in the Bahr el Ghazal region and it bordered Twic to the north, Aweil East to the northwest, Aweil to the west, Wau to the southwest, Tonj to the southeast, and Northern Liech to the northeast.

Gogrial Akuol comprises five Sections: Awan Mou Ring, Awan Chan Nyal, Kuac Ayok Gong, Aguok Mou Aken, and Apuk Giir Thiik/Jok Tong. Twic Mayardit was formerly a section in Gogrial up until the late 80’s, but is still referenced as a state today.

== History ==
On 2 October 2015, President Salva Kiir issued a decree establishing 28 states in place of the 10 constitutionally established states. The decree established the new states largely along ethnic lines. A number of opposition parties and civil society groups challenged the constitutionality of the decree. Kiir later resolved to take it to parliament for approval as a constitutional amendment. In November, the South Sudanese parliament empowered President Kiir to create new states. Gogrial State was created from part of the former Warrap State.

Abraham Gum Makuach was appointed Governor on 24 December 2015. Akec Tong Aleu, the previous governor, became governor of Tonj state after the division into 28 states, paving the way for the appointment of Makuach.

In February 2016, there were nine cabinet positions, including Governor and Deputy Governor. The state is required to have 21 legislators appointed to the state assembly.

Gogrial State is the home state of President Salva Kiir.

== Administrative divisions ==
After the split up, Gogrial State broke down even further for a total of 13 counties by Governor Makuach, which were created in February 2016: Two new additional counties were created later on to bring the total of 15. The 15 counties are part of the 180 counties in South Sudan. The 15 counties consist of the following:

- Former Gogrial East County:
  - Apuk East; headquarters: Lietnhom
  - Apuk North; headquarters: Nyang-Jur
  - Apuk South; headquarters: Pindit
  - Apuk West; headquarters: Ajogo
- Former Gogrial West County:
  - Aguok Centre; headquarters: Alek
  - Aguok North; headquarters: Mayom-Kadaduet
  - Aguok South; headquarters: Gogrial Town
  - Aguok West; headquarters: Keet
  - Awan Chan; headquarters: Akon
  - Awan Pajook; headquarters: Mayen Pajok
  - Awan Riau; headquarters: Pan-liet
  - Kuac East; headquarters: Ajiep
  - Kuac North; headquarters: Malual-Monyjoc or Karic
  - Kuac South; headquarters: Yienh-Liet or Ajep
  - Kuac West; headquarters: Mayom-Ariech

Nine of the counties are in Gogrial West and four are in Gogrial East. Makuach's plan received criticism as the Council of States recommended no more than eight counties per state.
