= Tonj East County =

- County
- Counties in Warrap
- Country: South Sudan
- State: Warrap State

Area
  - Total: 1,709 sq mi (4,425 km^{2})

Population (2017 estimate)
  - Total: 164,215
  - Density: 96.12/sq mi (37.11/km^{2})
- Time zone: UTC+2 (CAT)

Tonj East County is an administrative area in Warrap State, South Sudan. It has its headquarters at Romic Town.

Tonj East is part of the Greater Tonj Community. The Dinka–Nuer West Bank Peace & Reconciliation Conference of 1999 was held in Wunlit, a small town centre in Tonj East County. It is commonly called the "Wunlit Peace Conference". The conference brought together Nuer people from Western Upper Nile and Dinka people from Tonj, Rumbek, and Yirol. It is the most prominent and comprehensively documented case of a people-to-people peace process in what is now the Republic of South Sudan.

The current Tonj East County is carved out of the former Riangnhom Rural Council. Tonj District was made up of the 3 major rural councils including:

- Thiet Rural Council (the current Tonj South County)
- Liil Rural Council (the current Tonj North County)
- Riangnhom Rural Council (the current Tonj East County)

During the war of liberation period of Sudan People Liberation Movement & Army (SPLM/A), Tonj East was governed under Tonj County. The region then had two payams:

- Makuac Payam - comprising all 13 sections of the Luanyjang ethnic group
- Ananatak Payam - comprising Akook Tek, Luanykoth, Thiik, Adoor, Kongor, and Baac

In 2004 Dr. John Garang De Mabior, the then SPLM Chairman, split Tonj County under New Sudan administrative areas. The carved out Makuac Payam and Ananatak Payam were named the Tonj East County, governed at Romic town, an urban centre at the border end of both Makuac and Ananatak Payam.

The current Tonj East County is made up of the following communities:

- Luanyjang Aguer Adel, which includes 13 major sections of the Luanyjang tribe. Luanyjang is a Jieng ethnic community in the region dominated by the Rek Jieng ethnic group
- Akook Tek
- Thiik Majok Makom
- Luac Bol Malek (Luanykoth)
- Baac
- Kongor
- Adoor
- Pakor

== Notable Residents ==
Tonj East is the home to politicians from South Sudan and Warrap State, including:

- Hon. Awut Deng Acuil
- Gen. Mathiang Magordit
- Gen. Marial Abur
- Eng. Manhiem Bol Malek
- Gen. Keer Kiir Keer
- Dr Riak Gok Majok
