= Tonj State =

State of South Sudan from 2015 to 2020

- State
- Location of Tonj State within South Sudan
- Country: South Sudan
- Capital: Tonj
- Number of Counties: 22
- Number of municipalities: 1

Population (2014 Estimate)
  - Total: 448,950

Tonj State was a state in South Sudan that existed between 2 October 2015 and 22 February 2020. It was located in the Bahr el Ghazal region and it bordered Wau to the west, Gbudwe to the southwest, Gogrial to the northwest, Northern Liech to the northeast, Gok and Southern Liech to the east, and Western Lakes to the south and east.

== History ==
On 2 October 2015, President Salva Kiir issued a decree establishing 28 states in place of the 10 constitutionally established states. The decree established the new states largely along ethnic lines. A number of opposition parties and civil society groups challenged the constitutionality of the decree. Kiir later resolved to take it to parliament for approval as a constitutional amendment. In November the South Sudanese parliament empowered President Kiir to create new states.

Tonj State comprises what was formerly Tonj North, Tonj East and Tonj South Counties. The area is so large that at one time the South Sudan government considered dividing it up into two states instead of having one Tonj State. Previously, the areas comprising Tonj State had been part of Warrap State from 2011 to 2015. The city of Tonj serves the State Capital. Mathiang Magoordit is its current governor, Tonj was one of Western Bahr Al Ghazaal districts during 1944. The state cabinet, consisting of seven ministers and three advisors, was approved by the state's members of parliament in March 2016.

== Resources ==
Tonj State has two major rivers: the Jur River in the northern part of the state and the Tonj River in the southern and eastern parts of the state. Much of the land is considered suitable for agrarian activities.

== Notable residents ==
- Slate Nation

== Administrative divisions ==
After the split up, Tonj State broke down even further for a total of 19 counties. Five new additional counties were created later on to bring the total of 24. The 24 counties are part of the 182 counties in South Sudan. Tonj State also contains the municipality of Tonj Town. The 24 counties are consisted of the following:

- Former Tonj North County:
  - Alabek
  - Akop
  - Awul
  - Kirik
  - Konggor
  - Manloor
  - Marial Lou
  - Pagol
  - Rualbet
  - Warrap
- Former Tonj East County:
  - Luanyjang Centre
  - Luanyjang East
  - Luanyjang North
  - Luanyjang South
  - Ngapagok
  - Thiik
  - Palal
  - Wunlit
- Former Tonj South County:
  - Jak
  - Manyang-Ngok
  - Thiet
  - Tonj
  - Wanhalel
  - Mabior Yar
