= Warrap =

Warrap may refer to:

- Warrap, South Sudan, a town
- Warrap (state), a state of South Sudan
