= Warrap, South Sudan =

Warrap
- Town
- Location in South Sudan
- Coordinates: 8°8′N 28°37′E
- Country: South Sudan
- Region: Bahr el Ghazal
- State: Warrap State
- County: Tonj North County
- Time zone: UTC+2 (CAT)

Warrap (Arabic: واراب) is a town in the Tonj North County of Warrap State, in the Bahr el Ghazal region of South Sudan. Before the creation of new states in 2015, it was the capital of the state of Tonj State in South Sudan. It has since been supplanted as the capital by Kuajok.

The state comparises six counties: Twic, Tonj East, Tonj South, Tonj North, Gogrial East and Gogrial west.
