= Lake No =

Lake in South Sudan

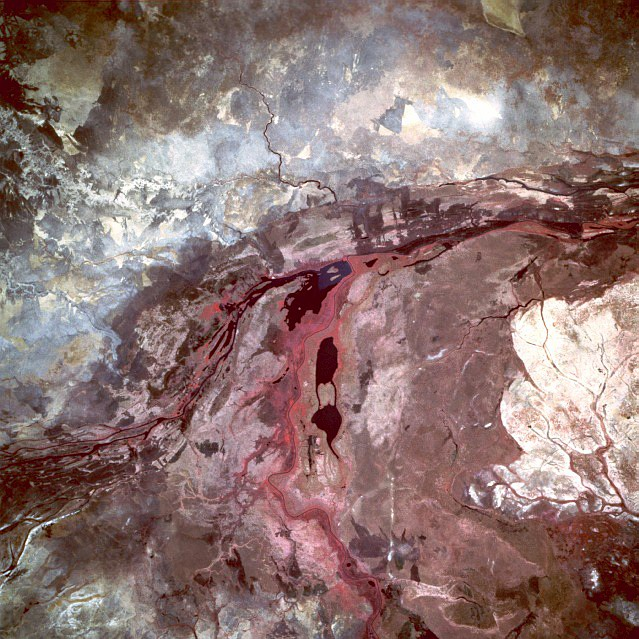
- Part of Sudd swamp with Lake No (top).

- Location within South Sudan
- Interactive map of Lake No
- Coordinates: 9°29′50″N 30°27′20″E
- Primary inflows: Bahr al Jabal, Bahr el Ghazal
- Primary outflows: White Nile
- Basin countries: South Sudan
- Surface area: 100 km^{2} (39 sq mi) (max)

Lake No is the largest lake in South Sudan, which is locally known as Dhoo Lake by Ruweng Panaruu community. It is located just north of the vast swamp of the Sudd, at the confluence of the Bahr al Jabal and Bahr el Ghazal rivers, and marks the transition between the Bahr al Jabal and White Nile proper. Lake No is located approximately 1,156 km downstream of Uganda's Lake Albert, the major lake on the White Nile preceding Lake No. The lake is considered the center of the Ruweng people of Panaruu section of Dinka peoples.

== See also ==
- East Africa
- Northeast Africa
