= Wunlit Peace Conference =

Sudanese conference

Wunlit Peace Conference Dinka–Nuer West Bank Peace & Reconciliation Conference
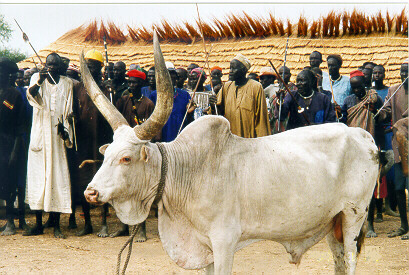
- Mabior white bull sacrificed at the conclusion of the Wunlit Peace Conference
- Host country: Sudan (now, South Sudan)
- Venues: Wunlit, South Sudan
- Participants: Southern Sudanese political and religious leaders and traditional authorities, the New Sudan Council of Churches

The Dinka–Nuer West Bank Peace & Reconciliation Conference of 1999 was held in what was then the Southern part of Sudan. It is commonly called the "Wunlit Peace Conference" after Wunlit, the village where it was held in eastern Tonj County in Bahr El Ghazal. The conference brought together Nuer from Western Upper Nile and Dinka from Tonj, Rumbek, and Yirol. It is the most prominent and comprehensively documented case of a people-to-people peace process in what is now the Republic of South Sudan.

== Background to conflict ==
The root-causes of the grievances that led to the Wunlit conference were complex and multi-dimensional. They were based on the interlacing between local, regional, national and international conflicts.

Political differences and power struggles within the Sudan People’s Liberation Movement/Army (SPLM/A) led by John Garang, which had been fighting against successive regimes in Khartoum since 1983, had escalated into a split of the SPLM/A in 1991. This split led to inter-tribal violence in many parts of the South. This year marked the organization of Wunlit peace and Reconciliation Conference by NSCC which brought together customary authorities from the Nuer of Western Upper Nile and the Dinka of Bahr-el-Ghazal. In the same year, the Southern insurgency had lost its main foreign supporter Ethiopia with the fall of Haile Mengistu, while the Islamist rulers in Northern Sudan received massive military assistance from Iran. Subsequently, fighting between Garang’s mainstream SPLM/A and the SPLM/A-Nasir factions under Riek Machar and Lam Akol, who turned to Khartoum, resulted in a particularly brutal period of warfare in Southern Sudan.

On the local level, inter-communal fighting increased from 1993 onwards and included cattle raiding, looting, abductions of children and women, and targeted killings of civilians. In addition, Kerubino Kuanyin Bol, one of the founding figures of the SPLM/A who had fallen out with Garang, began a series of devastating raids into his own home area of Gogrial / Twic in 1994 with the backing of the Khartoum regime. These became one of the chief causes of the famine that killed up to 50.000 civilians in 1997 and 1998. The years of 1994 and 1995 also saw revenge raids between Dinka and Nuer groups on the towns of Akot on the West Bank of the river Nile and Ganyliel on the Eastern Bank.

== Conference preparations ==
The New Sudan Council of Churches (NSCC) played a vital role in initiating, organizing, facilitating and moderating the Wunlit peace conference. The NSCC also provided for significant contributions from southern Sudanese civil society to the negotiations between the opposing parties from local communities.

According to John Ashworth, a veteran advisor to the NSCC and a former Catholic missionary in Southern Sudan, the Wunlit peace process was initiated in 1997. Since the churches had failed to mediate between Garang and Machar, they focussed on starting at the grassroots level, even organising preparatory meetings in Kenya, where the NSCC was based at the time.

“So in 1998, we brought together a group of Dinka and Nuer chiefs from the West Bank of the Nile. We brought them to Lokichogio, which was a safe place, and that was a key meeting that set the scene for the rest of the people-to-people process. They agreed, ‘We can’t keep on killing each other; we’re going to finish each other.”’

The NSCC then set up different committees responsible for lobbying, fundraising, and facilitating the Wunlit peace conference. Its leaders managed to mobilize international church bodies such as the World Council of Churches (WCC) and the All Africa Conference of Churches (AACC) to get involved in the peace initiative, especially by giving financial and moral support.

In terms of logistics, the NSCC assigned committee heads and rapporteurs to provide easels, boards, markers and tags to identify and differentiate the participants of the conference. At Wunlit itself - which was strategically located in the border region of the inter-communal conflict, but had been a relatively small settlement before without the necessary infrastructure – the NSCC organised logistical support to guarantee the smooth running of the conference. It helped the visitors and the host community with kits consisting of blankets, mosquito nets, and other personal items, as well as digging wells for water and managing the necessary air and land transport, including the construction of an air-strip.

In these efforts, significant contributions were also made by other external actors. Further financial support was granted by the governments of Norway and the USA, the United Nations through UNDP, and international NGOs such as World Vision, Christian AID and PACT.

Moreover, some external actors were considered as key mediators who conducted separate interviews with the two warring parties to find out the sources of the bitterness and grievances from both sides. They also acted as moderators ensuring the conference was on the right track and for this purpose would pray sometimes to calm down the intensity in the conference.

Not least, external actors played a crucial part in recording, transcribing and publishing the comprehensive conference proceedings, which have since been made available online as an open source, for lessons learnt.

== Conference proceedings ==
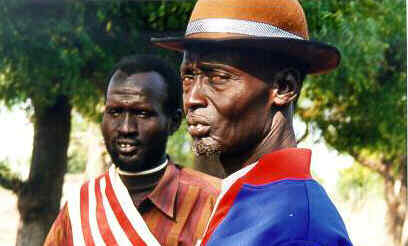
Nuer Chief Isaac Magok of Leer and Dinka Chief Madut Aguer of Tonj together at Wunlit (photographed by Bill Lowrey)

After some two years of preparations, the actual congress took place from February 27 until March 8, 1999. It was joined by church leaders, traditional chiefs, spear-masters, and elders, but also by youth and especially women, who accounted for about 30 percent of the attendees. From the non-civilian side, it included commissioners, members of ethnic militias, as well as representatives from Garang’s SPLM/A and Machar’s South Sudan Defense Force (SSDF). In addition, numerous external observers, donor officials, and international journalists were present.

The church organisers succeeded in bringing people together from six counties each of Bahr el Ghazal and Western Upper Nile respectively, which bordered one another. Each of the twelve counties was entitled to nominate thirty delegates, i.e. a total of 360 delegates. However, due to an offensive by the Khartoum-backed South Sudan Unity Movement / Army (SSUM/A) led by Paulino Matip, some counties did not turn up in full number. Only 12 people from Twic arrived in time, whereas no one from Abyei managed to attend the conference. Therefore, there were only 132 delegates from Bahr el Ghazal and 145 from Western Upper Nile. Yet, these numbers still fulfilled the 75% quorum, which made the conference eligible to proceed. (Dinka - Nuer West Bank Peace & Reconciliation Conference. P. 7) Altogether, the number of people present in the conference reached well over 1.000, as the delegates were joined by advisory and support persons.

Amongst the most prominent observers were the following: Salva Kiir, then Deputy Commander-in-Chief of SPLM/A and since 2011 President of South Sudan; Nhial Deng Nhial, the SPLM Governor of Bahr el Ghazal region; Catholic Bishop Nathanial Garang of Yirol Diocese; Reverend Mathew Mathiang of Wau Diocese, Reverend William Lowrey from the Presbyterian Church; Haruun Ruun, the executive secretary of NSCC; Andrew Kuac Mayol, SPLM Commissioner of Tonj County; Joseph Juac Kon, Commissioner of Leer County from the United Democratic Salvation Front (UDSF); Peter Nyot Kok, a professor of law and SPLM legal expert; former MPs Gabrial Yoal and Samuel Aru Bol as representatives of the Khartoum government; Faruk Gatkuoth, secretary-general of the UDSF of Machar; John Kulang Puot, a government-appointed commissioner of Fangak; Peter Par Jiek of the SSDF.

The first day, February 27, was opened with the slaughtering of a white bull – “Mabior-thon” in Dinka as well as “Mabor” in Nuer language - as a sacrifice. The white bull was provided by the chief of Jalwau in Wunlit, Gum Mading. The killing of this bull signified the commitment of both communities toward peace and reconciliation, as it was meant to cleanse out the bad things that had been committed against one another. Chief Nyal Chan Nyal declared: “We have all seen the sacrifice of Mabior (white Bull), Nuer and myself, we Dinka which has washed the devil between us.”

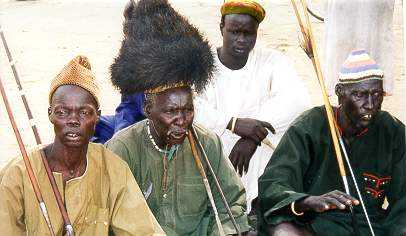
Benybith, Masters of the Fishing Spear (photographed by William O. Lowrey)

The opening day also included Christian worship ceremonies in local languages. The Dinka service was led by Simon Bil and the Nuer one by George Riak. They were followed by an invocation offering from spiritual leaders – Benybith - from the Jieng (Dinka) side and Kuar-Muon from the Naath (Nuer) side. (Note: Benybith and Kuar-Muon are traditional religious specialists. Benybith ("master of the fishing spear") are Dinka priests (though this term is not universal among Dinka speakers). Kuar-Muon ("earth priest") are Nuer priests. For benybith, see Lienhardt, Godfrey (1961). Divinity and Experience : The Religion of the Dinka: The Religion of the Dinka. Oxford. ISBN 9780191591853. and for kuar-muon see Hutchinson, Sharon Elaine (1996). Nuer Dilemmas: Coping with Money, War, and the State. University of California Press. p. 36. ISBN 9780520202849.) William Ray Kuong addressed the audience as follows: “I speak to you, we all of us; we Southerners, we are all people of one God. We fought each other for many years, O God. I myself have been a great fighter. My ancestors before me were warriors; I fought fiercely for many years. We elders know the history of this conflict.”

The second day continued with the introduction of dignitaries and guests, before storytelling started. These narrations took four days and were divided into two sections, as one community was to tell their grievances without interruption by the other. Chief Jacob Madhel Lang Juk from Twic said: “I am pleased that God has placed the hope of peace in our hearts so that we can end the fighting between us.”

The Sixth day featured the general addresses from Rumbek and guests in addition to the formation of discussion groups. Six groups were formed and chaired by rapporteurs to discuss issues that were raised and the solutions suggested during the Conference. They included the following:

• Missing persons and marriages to the abductees with rapporteur: Dhol Achuil

• How to monitor the border issues. Rapporteur: Telar Deng

• Institutional arrangements such as border courts, police, appeal processes and Dinka/Nuer coordinating council. With rapporteur: Michael Wal Duany

• People outside the peace process. With rapporteur: Faruk Gatkuoth

• Reclaiming the land and rebuilding relationships. With rapporteurs: Rev. Mathew Mathiang and Peter Nyot Kok

• Extending the peace to the East bank and Equatoria. With rapporteur: John Luk

On the seventh day the discussions groups came out with the following recommendations:

• Facilitation of border administration stations.

• Giving each District a radio that can easily be monitored by the police and border Chiefs

• Disarming all the civilians holding firearms

• Absorption of all local civilian militias, Gelweng in Dinka or Jiecabul in Nuer into army or should submitted their firearms.

• Division of Bahr el Ghazal and Western Upper Nile into police post

• Composition of the Police force and provision of the arms, munitions, other equipment and training.

• Establishing of the joined police

• Revival and strengthening of the existing courts as well as training of paralegal men courts

• Applications of the Customary laws

• Border courts shall original jurisdiction

• Formation of coordinating council

• Marriage to abducted

• Affirm freedom of movement

• Promotion of Dinka- Nuer reconciliation and familial

• Take the same peace initiative to other parts of Southern Sudan

The eighth day saw the completion of these reports and the signing of the accord and its resolutions. Each delegate signed or placed his or her thumb print on the final documents. During its conclusion, the covenant was blessed through Christian worship ceremonies and another traditional sacrifice of a white bull.

== Historical assessments ==
The Wunlit peace conference brought an immediate cessation of hostilities between Dinka and Nuer communities of the West Bank. Cattle rustling, the abduction of women and children, and killings came to an end after the conference. Dinka and Nuer military forces as well as armed civilians stopped violent actions against each other.

In the context of Wunlit’s amnesty declaration, all sorts of past offenses were immediately and unconditionally pardoned by both sides. Dinka and Nuer started to move freely across each other’s territory with their animals to share grazing land, water, fishing ground and other natural resources.1 The local cross-border agreement and arrangement of Wunlit was respected by both sides.

People who had been displaced from their land of origins were encouraged to return to their home villages and to rebuild the lost trust with their neighbors. In September 1999, 148 abductees were reunited with their families and 141 cattle were returned to their owners.

The Wunlit peace conference idea was extended to numerous other conflicts in Southern Sudan, most prominently to the East Bank in Waat and Lilir in 1999 and 2000 respectively. Also in 2000, another similar conference was held in the Kenyan city of Kisumu. It drew women representatives from the previous conferences as well as chiefs, community leaders, elders and youth in a bid to realise greater peace in Southern Sudan. Again, women constituted about a third of the participants and their voices were key to the conference, which aimed at mediating between Garang and Machar. According to NSCC-advisor Ashworth, the Wunlit conference and successive peace processes greatly contributed to the reconciliation between the two main rivals and to the SPLM/A reunification in 2002.

However, there are also critical perceptions of the Wunlit conference, for instance a lack of inclusivity in contrast to the people-to-people principle and the fact that the NSCC gave the initiative of religious orientation. Also, the NSCC and some NGOs were viewed by some as too closed to the SPLM/A and as favouring the West Bank.

Further criticisms pointed to the lack of an enforcement mechanism to sustain the agreements and complained about an unequal access to services as well as about perceived disparate political rights.

One of the preeminent scholars of Southern Sudanese History, Douglas Johnson, concluded that “In so far as the Wunlit conference of February–March 1999 was a success, it was less to do with the meeting itself as the months of preparation that led up to it.”

== Legacy ==
Communities in the Wunlit Triangle, the shared border area of what became Lakes, Warrap and Unity states, lived peacefully until the South Sudanese Civil War started in December 2013. The multi-sided civil war between forces of the government of the newly independent South Sudan and opposition forces reignited mistrust and ethnic divisions, mainly between people affiliated with the Nuer and Dinka tribes. Therefore, a number of NGOs - namely Saferworld, the Women Development Group (WDG), the Women Initiative for Development Organisation (WIDO), Hope Restoration and Voice for Change - took inspiration from the historical Wunlit conference and organised a peace meeting, which was held between 28 February and 4 March 2023 in Rumbek, the capital of Lakes State. It brought together chiefs, government administrators, civil society representatives, women and youthleaders, as well as aid and development partners.
