= Nhial =

Nhial is a Dinka surname. Notable people with the surname include:

- Abdallah Deng Nhial (born c. 1954), South Sudanese politician
- Nhial Deng Nhial (fl. 1983), South Sudanese politician
- Paulino Matip Nhial (1942–2012), South Sudanese politician
- William Deng Nhial (1929–1968), South Sudanese revolutionary
