= Wunlit =

- boma village
- Location within South Sudan
- Coordinates: 7°58′28.5″N 28°50′19.9″E
- Country: South Sudan
- Region: Bahr el Ghazal
- State: Warrap State
- County: Tonj North County
- Payam: Thiet

Wunlit is a village in the Tonj North County of Warrap State, in the Bahr el Ghazal region of South Sudan. The village is most widely known for a peace conference held there in 1999.

== Wunlit peace conference ==
The Wunlit Peace Conference of 1999 was an important part of the People-to-People Peace Process in Southern Sudan. It was facilitated by the New Sudan Council of Churches. The People-to-People Peace Process began in 1998 with a series of local conferences; it continued with the Wunlit Conference, which brought together Dinka from Bahr al-Ghazal and Nuer from Western Upper Nile, and a series of subsequent conferences in Akobo, Waat, and Liliir. It culminated in the All Southern Peace conference of 2001, which was held in Kisumu, Kenya. The Wunlit Conference grew out of agreement made in December, 1998, by Dinka and Nuer chiefs in Lokichogio, in northern Kenya, and a series of visits to Western Upper Nile by Dinka chiefs in early-1999, and to Thiet by Nuer chiefs in mid-1999.

Residents of Wunlit specially constructed a village to accommodate the roughly 1,500 people who took part in the conference. The village consisted of 150 houses and a large meeting hall, which was later used as a school. Residents of the surrounding area also built a 12 kilometer road and an airstrip so that observers and participants in the conference could arrive there. (Note: For a discussion of how the Wunlit Peace Conference fit into the wider People-to-People Peace Process and the broader work of the New Sudan Council of Churches, see Hadley Jenner (2000). “When Truth is Denied, Peace Will Not Come”: The People-to-People Peace Process of the New Sudan Council of Churches (PDF) (Report). cdacollaborative. p. 21.)

In July 2003, a second meeting, called "Wunlit 2," was held in Wunlit to address cattle raiding being carried out by soldiers. The meeting had roughly one hundred participants and was facilitated by the New Sudan Council of Churches. Participants resolved to establish a series of joint police posts in border areas to monitor cattle raiding and agreed on methods to arbitrate in cattle disputes.
