= South Sudan Liberation Movement =

South Sudanese guerrilla organisation (1999-present)

- SSLM logo & flag
- Leaders: Peter Gadet; Matthew Puljang; James Gai Yoach; Bapiny Montuil
- Dates active: 1999–Present
- Active regions: Upper Nile, Jonglei
- Ideology: Southern Sudanese Separatism
- Wars: Second Sudanese Civil War

The South Sudan Liberation Movement (SSLM) is an armed group that operates in the Upper Nile Region of South Sudan. The group's creation was announced in November 1999 by people of the Nuer ethnicity who were in both the rebel Sudan People's Liberation Army (SPLA) and the government-allied South Sudan Defence Forces (SSDF) gathered in Waat. The SSLM was declared to be unaligned in the Second Sudanese Civil War, then entering its sixteenth year. The name "South Sudan Liberation Movement" was decided upon the next year, borrowing from the earlier Southern Sudan Liberation Movement, which existed in the 1980s.

== Background ==
The SSLM was formed in the context of widespread factional fighting among the Western Nuer ethnic group of Unity, South Sudan, who had signed a peace treaty with the government on 21 April 1997. The pro-government SSDF militia, comprising a large number of Nuer, had divided into warring factions led by Riek Machar and Paulino Matip. As Riek was being defeated, opposing government-aligned militias attacked civilians around the oilfields in South Sudan, causing a stream of Nuer refugees to flee towards SPLA-controlled Bahr al-Ghazal for protection. At least two previously pro-government Nuer militias aligned themselves with the SPLA, while the few Nuer loyal to the politically weakened Riek began to abandon the government's cause. The fact that Nuer refugees were being protected by the Dinka-dominated SPLA led to an unusual conference in Wunlit, sponsored by the New Sudan Council of Churches and the safety of which was guaranteed by the SPLA. Groups of Western Nuer and Dinka from Tonj, Rumbek and Yirol took part, leading to a peace agreement in March 1999 to end the ethnic fighting. The creation of the SSLM was accompanied by the announcement that most of the Nuer had formally broken away from the government. Between November 1999 and January 2000, the group was known as the Upper Nile Provisional Military Command Council (UMCC).

== Political stance ==
The SSLM claimed that it followed "two avenues to assert the rights of the people of South Sudan to freedom and self-determination". The group stated that it was in favor of negotiation with the government of Sudan until an acceptable peace-accord is signed and the government stops its raids in southern Sudan, but the Comprehensive Peace Agreement of 9 January 2005, was seen by the SSLM as promising nothing new differing from past treaties only in its observance by the international community.

== 2011 resurgence ==
On 11 April 2011 the SSLM published a document that it called the Mayom Declaration, calling for a more inclusive government in South Sudan. Violence began with an assault SPLA in Unity State, leaving at least 45 people dead. According to the military, 20 of the victims were southern army soldiers. SSLA's spokesperson has said that the movement has declared a ceasefire with the government.

== 2013 amnesty and activity ==
On 26 April 2013 the South Sudanese government announced that it had granted an amnesty to SSLA fighters and that 3,000 men, comprising the entire force, had taken up the offer, crossed the border from Sudan and brought around 100 vehicles with them (including 37 technicals armed with machine guns and AA guns). President Salva Kiir pardoned all SSLA members who had surrendered their weapons to security forces. The former SSLA members are to be integrated into the South Sudanese army. Two other militia groups also took up the amnesty offer. An SSLA spokesperson said "Our forces have joined the peace process with the South Sudan army" and that "because South Sudan needs development, peace and forgiveness, we have decided to end rebellion in South Sudan". The surrender took place in Mayom County, Unity State and were led by the SSLA's commander, Brigadier General Bapiny Monytuel. SSLA commanders will meet President Kiir in Juba within a week to formalise the surrender arrangements.

== South Sudanese Civil War (2013–2020) ==
During the South Sudanese Civil War, former SSLA troops who had been assimilated into the SPLA moved to expel rebel factions loyal to Riek Machar from Bentiu.
