= Republican Party of South Sudan =

- Chairman: Lewis Anei Madut
- Founded: 22 June 2017
- Dissolved: 10 April 2019
- Split from: SPLM
- Merged into: SPLM
- Ideology: South Sudanese nationalism
- National Legislative Assembly: 0 / 170

The Republican Party of South Sudan was a political party in South Sudan.

== Origins ==
The Sudan People's Liberation Movement (SPLM), the governing party of South Sudan, fractured in December 2013, leading to the civil war, which killed thousands and forced a large number of people to seek refuge in neighbouring countries. The party was formed on 22 June 2017 by senior officials who have split from the Sudan People's Liberation Movement (SPLM) faction allied to President Salva Kiir.

== History ==
Former governor of the defunct Warrap state, Lewis Anei Madut, was heavily endorsed to be the party's new chairman. The new party's deputy chairman and secretary general were also elected at the same meeting of the founding members. Speaking at the official launch of the party, Lewis Anei Madut said "the Republican Party of South Sudan is a non-violent political organization formed after being inspired by the call to unite the country along a political party that aspires for equal rights of all the people of South Sudan."

== Members ==
=== Elected officials ===
- Chairman: Lewis Anei Madut - Former governor of the now defunct state Warrap
- Deputy Chairman:
- Secretary General:
- Party Lawyer: Philip Manyok Kuol

=== Founding members ===
- Anthony Agiem Akot
- John Garang Dau USA-Chapter
- Salva Kiir
- Paul Malong Awan
- Kuol Manyang

== See also ==
- Sudan People's Liberation Movement
