= Aleu (disambiguation) =

Aleu may refer to:

- Aleu, commune in the Ariège department, France
- Estadi Baldiri Aleu, rugby union stadium in Sant Boi de Llobregat, Barcelona Province, Spain

== Surname ==
- Akec Tong Aleu, South Sudanese politician
- Ana María Hidalgo Aleu (born 1959), Spanish-French politician
- Dolors Aleu i Riera (1857 – 1913), Spanish medical doctor
- Francesc de Paula Castelló Aleu (1914 – 1936), Spanish Roman Catholic killed during the Spanish Civil War
