= Madut Kon Awan =

South Sudanese politician

Madut Kon Awan is a current member of state parliament in Warrap State, South Sudan, representing Turalei. A former soldier in the first and second Sudanese civil wars, he rose to the rank of Lieutenant in the rebel movement Sudan People's Liberation Army (SPLA), now the South Sudan's national army. he is considered by some as a fierce fighter and a brave commanding officer who fought relentlessly in battles. Others in the ranks saw him as short tempered and too commanding. He worked with NGO's in the early 1990s before joining politics and was elected in 2010 Sudanese national elections on the SPLM ticket.
