= Biem =

Biem may refer to:

- Biem, South Sudan
- Biem language
- Biem Benyamin
- Biem Dudok van Heel
- Bam Island (Papua New Guinea), also known as Biem
- BIEM, abbreviation for Bureau International de l'Edition Mecanique
