= Kuajok =

Kuajok Kwajok or Kuacjok
- City
- Location in South Sudan
- Coordinates: 8°18′36″N 27°59′24″E
- Country: South Sudan
- Region: Bahr el Ghazal
- State: Warrap State
- County: Gogrial West County
- Elevation: 415 m (1,362 ft)

Population (2008 est.)
  - Total: 78,111
- Time zone: UTC+2 (CAT)

Kuajok, also spelled as Kuacjok or Kwajok, is a city in South Sudan, and the capital of Warrap State.

== Location ==
Kuajok is located in Warrap State, in Bahr el Ghazal Region, in northwestern South Sudan, near the international border with the Republic of Sudan and the Abyei Region. This location lies approximately 690 kilometres (430 mi), by road, northwest of Juba, the capital of South Sudan and the largest city in that country, and approximately 100 kilometres (62 mi), by road, north of Wau, the largest city in the Bahr el Ghazal Region.

== Overview ==
The city of Kuajok lies on Highway B38, along the western bank of the Jur River, close to the geographic point where the borders of Northern Bahr el Ghazal State, Warrap State and Western Bahr el Ghazal State intersect. Approximately 34 kilometres (21 mi) further north on B38 lies the town of Gogrial, one of two places where the former NBA player, Manute Bol, might have been born. Kuajok serves as the capital of Warrap State.

== Points of interest ==
The following points of interest lie in or near the town of Kuajok:

- The Jur River - The river passes to the east of the town
- Gogrial Airport - A small civilian airport, with a single unpaved runway
- The main road from Wau to Babanusa, Sudan (Highway B38) passes through Kuajok in a north to south direction
- The town of Gogrial, Warrap State, lies approximately 34 kilometres (21 mi) north of Kuajok, along Highway B38

== See also ==
- Warrap State
- Bahr el Ghazal Region
- Gogrial
- Wau
- Dinka people
- Nuer people

== External list ==
- Location of Kwajok At Google Maps
