= Lietnhom =

Lietnhom, also documented as Liet-Nhom, is the capital of Gogrial East County, Warrap State, South Sudan.

There is a prison in Lietnhom. The United Nations reported on inadequacies at the prison.

Pastoral cattle ranching is traditional on the area.
