= Akec Tong Aleu =

South Sudanese politician

General Akech Tong Aleu is a South Sudanese politician. He served for four months as the Director General of the National Security Service Bureau of the Government of South Sudan.

Gen. Akech Tong Aleu began his public service as the Commissioner of Tonj South County, Warrap State in 2012 before serving as Deputy Governor of Warrap State from in the year 2012 to August 2015.

He briefly held the position of caretaker Governor of Warrap State from August to December 2015.

Following the creation of 28 states by President Salva Kiir in October 2015, Gen. Akech became the first Governor of the newly established Tonj State.

Earlier in 2018, Gen. Akech Tong Aleu served as Minister of Cabinet Affairs in Warrap State playing a critical role in regional decision-making.

Between April 2024 to late September, Gen. Akech served as the Undersecretary for Veteran Affairs at the Ministry of Defense and Veteran Affairs.

On October 2, 2024, in a presidential decree read on South Sudan Broadcasting Corporation (SSBC), Salva Kiir appointed Gen. Akech as the Director General of the National Security Service's (NSS) Internal Bureau.
