= Ruweng Administrative Area =

Administrative area in South Sudan

- Administrative area
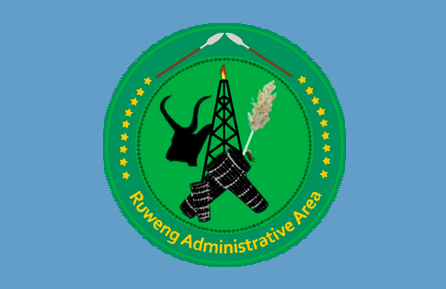
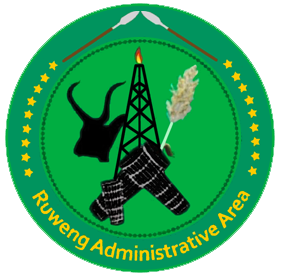
- Flag Seal

- Location of the Ruweng Administrative Area in South Sudan

- Location of Ruweng state (2015–2020)
- Country: South Sudan
- Number of Counties: 2
- Capital: Pariang

Government
  - Chief Administrator: H.E. Tiop Manyluak De Diran

Population (2014 estimate)
  - Total: 246,360
- Time zone: UTC+2 (CAT)

The Ruweng Administrative Area is an administrative area in South Sudan. The area was known as Ruweng State between 2 October 2015 and 22 February 2020 when it was a state of South Sudan.

== History ==
On 1 October 2015, President Salva Kiir issued a decree establishing 28 states instead of the 10 constitutionally established states. The decree established the new states largely along ethnic lines. Several opposition parties and civil society groups challenged the decree's constitutionality. Kiir later resolved to take it to parliament for approval as a constitutional amendment. In November the South Sudanese parliament empowered President Kiir to create new states. Mayol Kur Akuei was appointed governor in 2015.

== Chief administrators ==
Tenure	Incumbent	Party
May 2015 – 2017	Mayol Kur Akuei	SPLM
2017 – 2017	Theji Da Aduot Deng	SPLM (IO)
2017 – June 2020	Them Michar Kuol	SPLM (IO)
2019 – 2020	Dr. Lawrence Miabok Wuor Piok	SPLM
June 2020 – 2021	William Chol Awanlith	SPLM
June 2021 – May 2022	Hon. Peter Daau Chopkuer	SPLM
May 2022 – June 2022	Hon. Tiob de Monyluak de Diraan	SPLM
June 2022 – May 2024	Stephano Wieu Mialek	SPLM
May 2024 – Incumbent	Hon. Tiop Manyluak Diraan	SPLM

On 16 June 2022, President Salva Kiir appointed a new chief administrator.

On 8 June 2021, President Salva Kiir appointed a new chief administrator.

== Geography ==
The Ruweng Administrative Area is located in the northern part of South Sudan and its headquarters is at Pariang. It borders the former Upper Nile State in the east and Jonglei State in the southeast, Unity State in the south, Warrap State in the southwest, Abyei to the northwest, and Sudan in the north.

== Economy ==
It is the most oil-producing area in South Sudan. About 80% of South Sudanese oil is produced here, mainly in the Unity / Darbim oil field (in the southern part), Heglig / Panthou oil field (in the north-western part), Tomasouth/Kaloj oilfield (in the western part), Toor / Athony oil field or, Labob / Miading and Munga / Wanhe Danluel oilfield, Maan Awal, and other fields.

Ruweng is rich in animal resources and fish resources, and it also is the home of two lakes: Lake Jau (in the northern part) and Lake No locally known as Dhoo (in the southern part), where Bahr el Ghazal River ends and joins the White Nile. Ruweng is rich in agricultural land and wildlife.

== Demographics ==
Ruweng is the home of Ruweng Dinkas, who are Panaruu Dinka with 12 sub-tribes, and Aloor or Ruweng Biemnom Dinka with six sub-tribes.

== Administrative divisions ==
The area consists of eight counties: Jau County, Aliny County, Wunkur County, Lake No county, Jamjang County, Tuoch County, Abiemnom East County, and Abiemnom West County.

== See also ==
- Biem, South Sudan
