= Gogrial Airport =

- IATA: n/a; ICAO: HSGO

Summary
- Airport type: Public, Civilian & Military
- Owner: Civil Aviation Authority of South Sudan
- Serves: Gogrial, Warrap State, South Sudan
- Location: Gogrial, South Sudan
- Elevation AMSL: 1,302 ft / 397 m
- Coordinates: 08°32′24″N 28°06′00″E

Map
- Location of Gogrial Airport in South Sudan

Runways
Direction	Length		Surface
Direction	ft	m	Surface
			Unpaved

Gogrial Airport is an airport in South Sudan.

== Location and layout ==
Gogrial Airport (IATA: n/a, ICAO: HSGO) is located in Gogrial West County, Warrap State, in the town of Gogrial, near the borders with the Republic of Sudan and the Abyei Region. The airport is located within the central business district of the town.

This location lies approximately 560 kilometres (350 mi), by air, northwest of Juba International Airport, the largest airport in South Sudan. The geographic coordinates of this airport are: 8° 32' 24.00"N, 28° 06' 0.00"E (Latitude: 8.8670; Longitude: 28.1170). Gogrial Airport is situated 397 metres (1,302 ft) above sea level. The airport has a single unpaved runway, which is expected to be turned into a taxiway as the airport expands with a new runway and passenger terminal facility.

== Overview ==
Gogrial Airport is a small civilian airport that serves the town of Gogrial and surrounding communities. There are no scheduled airline flights to Gogrial Airport at this time.

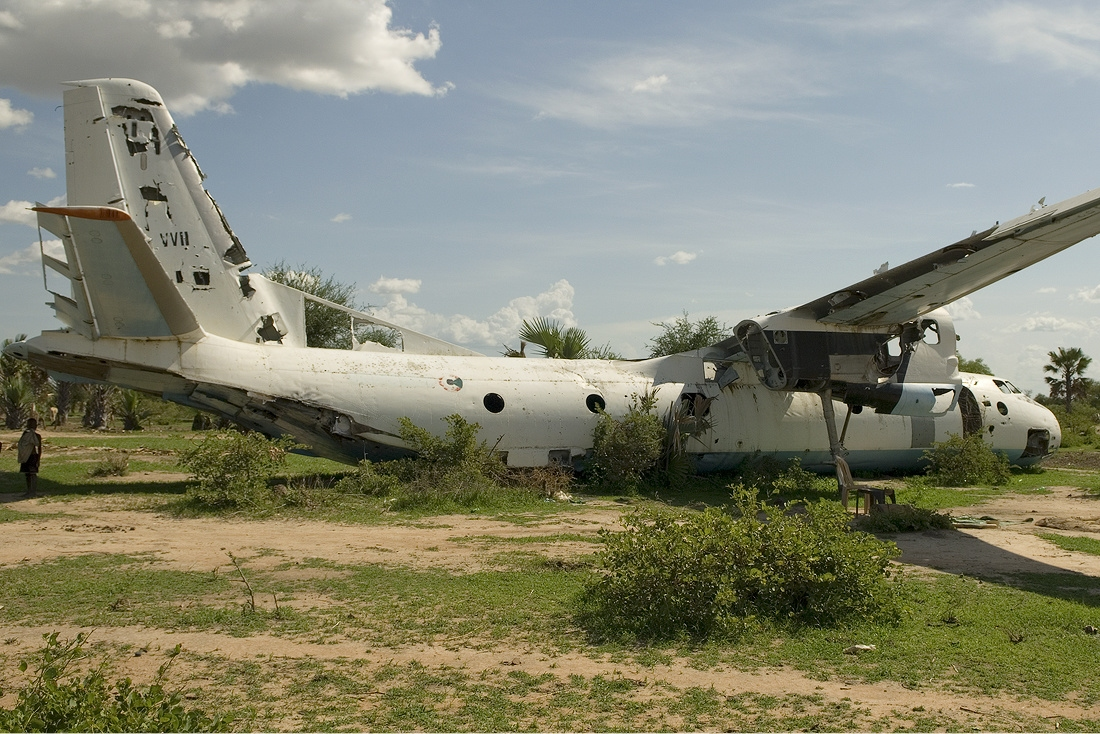
Sudan Air Force Antonov An-26-100 crash-landed in 1997 at the airstrip of Gogrial.

== See also ==
- List of airports in South Sudan
- Warrap (state)
