= Gogrial East County =

- County
- Counties in Warrap
- Country: South Sudan
- State: Warrap State

Area
  - Total: 1,709 sq mi (4,425 km^{2})

Population (2017 estimate)
  - Total: 146,276
  - Density: 85.62/sq mi (33.06/km^{2})
- Time zone: UTC+2 (CAT)
- Capital: Lietnhom

Gogrial East County is an administrative area in Warrap State, South Sudan. In am area of flat grasslands, sorghum crops and cattle grazing are livelihoods. The Jur River passes through northern Gogrial East County and fishing is also an important food source. Maize, millet, sesame, and groundnut are other crops. Planting is done during the rainy season.

Ajogo Payam is an administrative division within it.
