= Bahr el Ghazal River =

Bahr el Ghazal
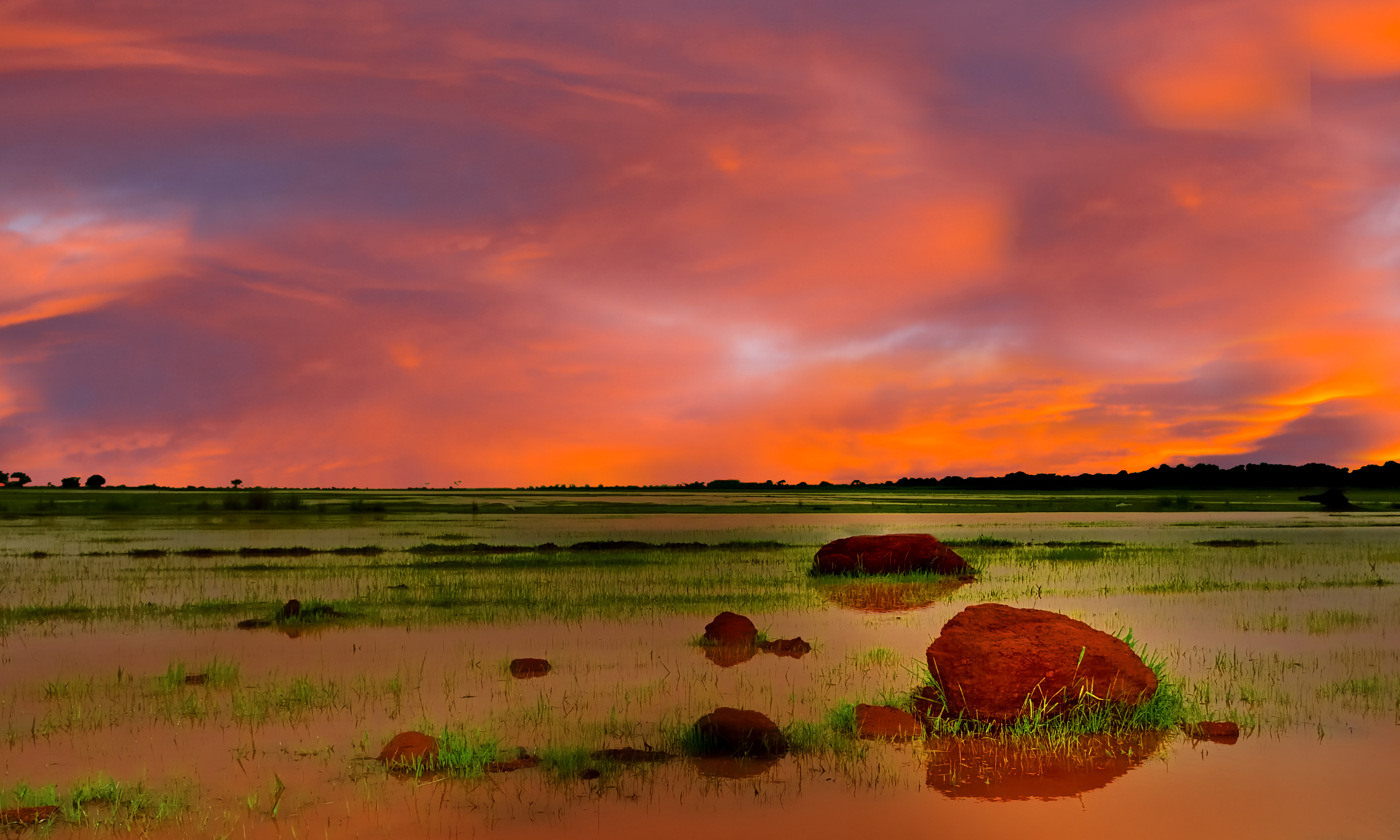

Location
- Country: South Sudan

Physical characteristics
- Source: Sudd swamps
- 2nd source: Jur River
  - location: Ibba, Western Equatoria
  - coordinates: 4°22′12″N 29°15′25″E
  - elevation: c. 428 m (1,404 ft) above sea level
- Mouth: White Nile
  - location: Pariang, Ruweng
  - coordinates: 9°31′N 30°25′E
  - elevation: 396 m (1,299 ft)
- Length: 716 km (445 mi)
- Basin size: 851,459 km^{2} (328,750 sq mi)
- Discharge
  - average: 48 m^{3}/s (1,700 cu ft/s)

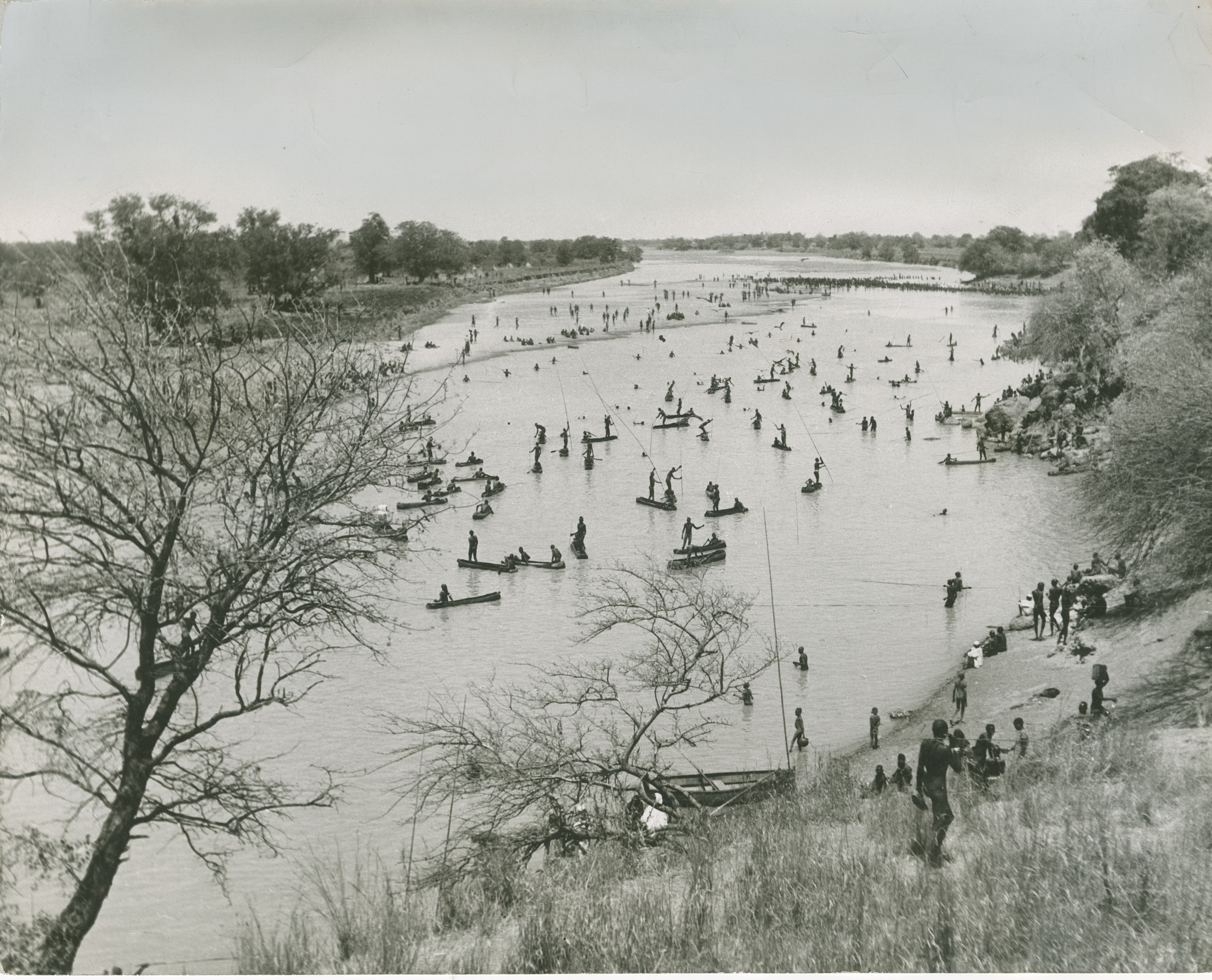
View of boat club on the Lol River, Bahr al-Ghazal

The Bahr el Ghazal (Arabic: بحر الغزال, lit. 'sea of gazelles') or Naam River (Nuer) is a river in South Sudan. The South Sudanese region of Bahr el Ghazal takes its name from the river.

The Bahr el Ghazal is the main western tributary of the Nile. It is 716 km (445 mi) long, flowing through the Sudd wetlands to Lake No, where it joins the White Nile.

== Hydrology ==
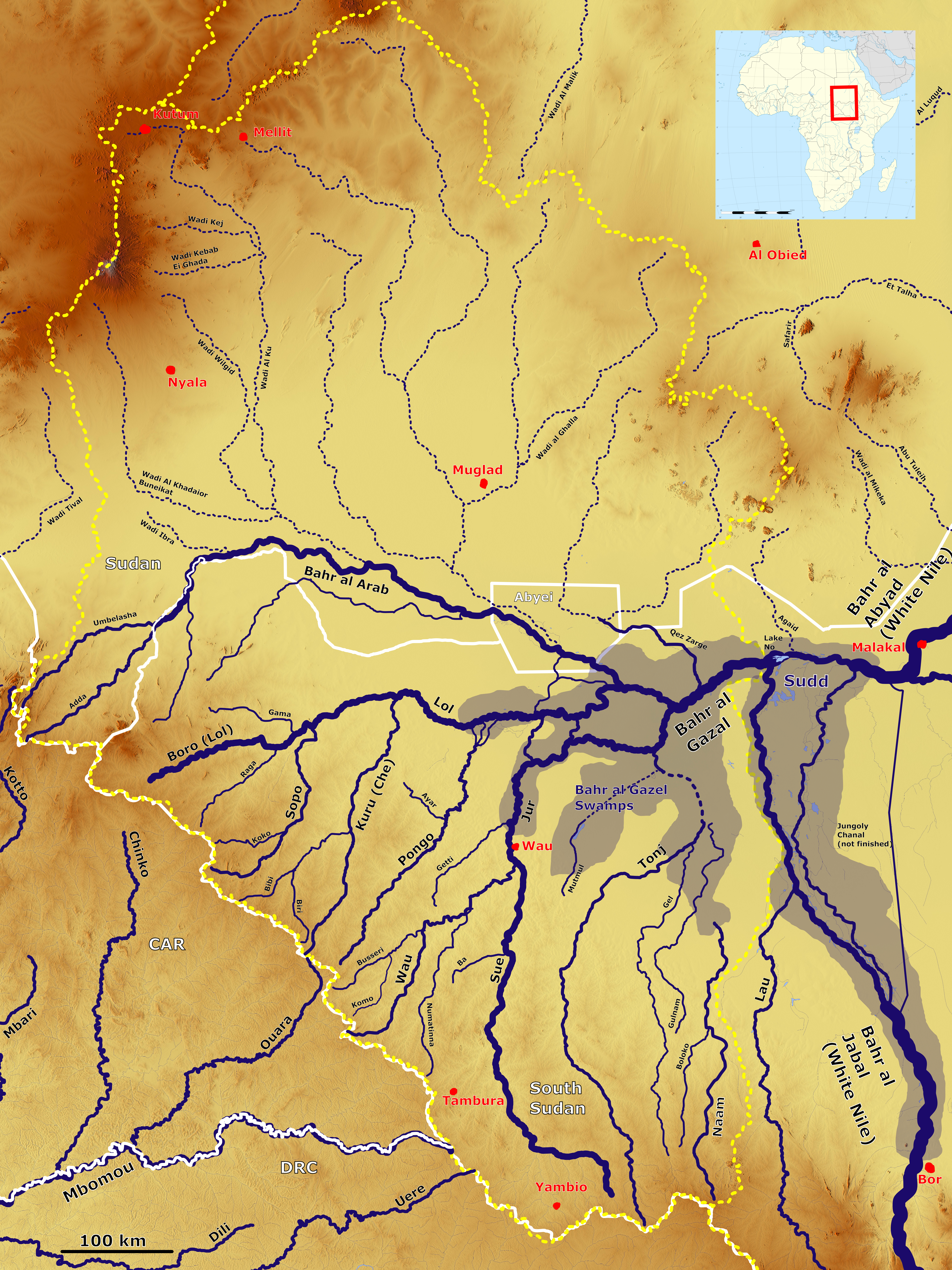
Bahr el Ghazal River basin

The Bahr al Ghazal's drainage basin is the largest of any of the Nile's subbasins, measuring 520,000 km^{2} (200,800 mi^{2}) in size, but it contributes a relatively small amount of water, about 2 m^{3}/s (70 ft^{3}/s) annually, due to tremendous volumes of water being lost in the Sudd wetlands. Seasonally, the river's discharge ranges from nothing to 48 m^{3}/s (1,700 ft^{3}/s).

According to some sources, the river is formed by the confluence of the Jur River and Bahr al-Arab rivers. However other more recent sources say the river rises in the Sudd wetlands with no definitive source, that the Jur River joins at Lake Ambadi, and the Bahr al-Arab joins below that. The river's drainage basin, including its tributaries, is 851,459 square kilometres (328,750 sq mi) and reaches west to the border of the Central African Republic and northwest to the Darfur region.

== History ==
The river was first mapped in 1772 by French geographer Jean-Baptiste Bourguignon d'Anville, although it was vaguely known to early Greek geographers.

== See also ==
- List of rivers of South Sudan
