= Bongo Massif =

Mountain range near Sudan

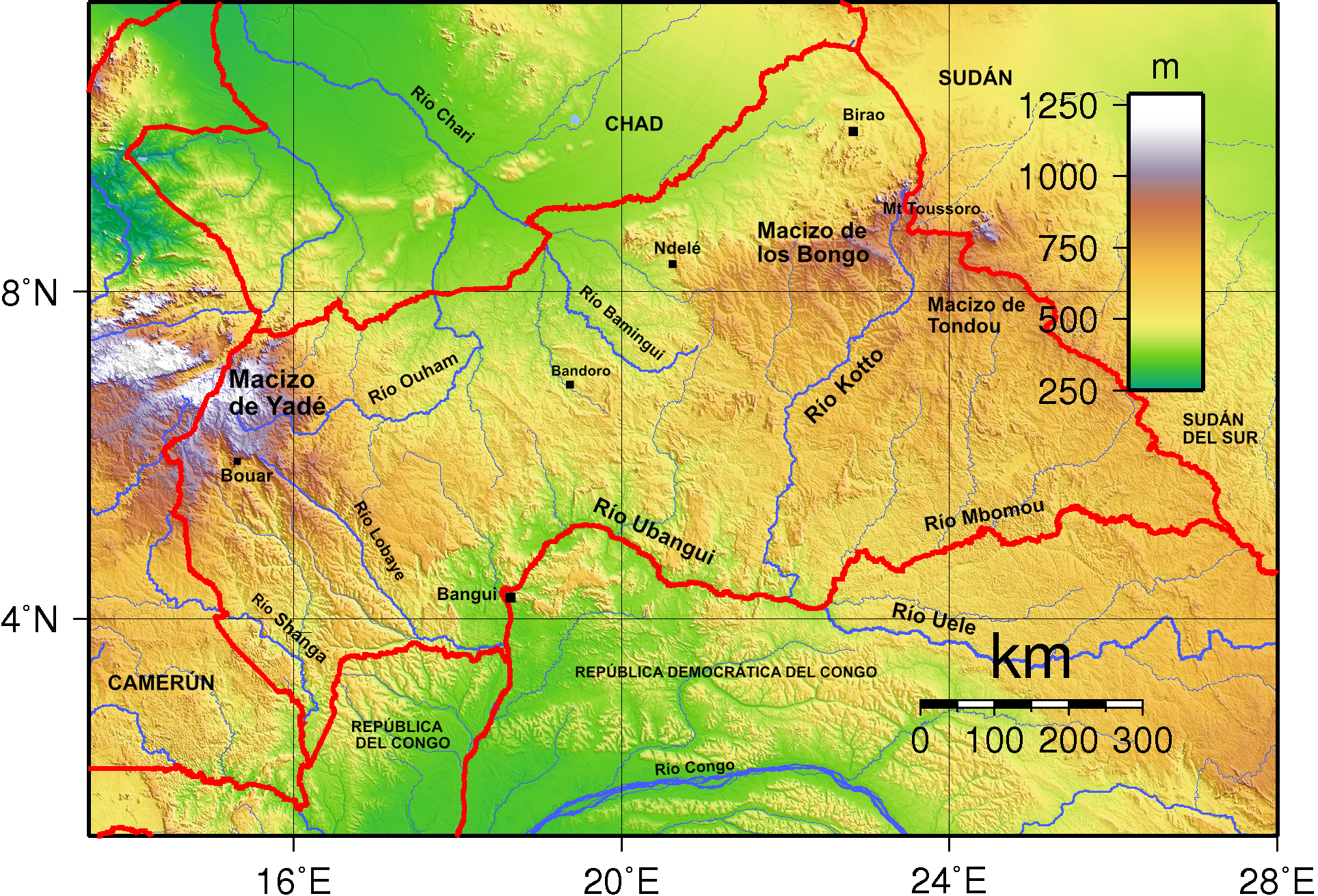
Bongo Massif

The Bongo Massif (French: massif des Bongo), also known as the Tondou Massif, is a mountain range in north-eastern Central African Republic, near the Sudan border. The source of Bahr al-Arab is found within the massif. South of the massif is the Plateau of Ouadda (Coordinates: 08°40′0″N 22°25′0″E).

== Summits ==
Summits in the Bongos include:

- Mount Toussoro, 1368 meters

== Geology ==
The lithology is dominated by rugged sandstone.

== Miscellaneous ==
During November, December, and January, fires of several kilometres size advance down from the Chadian border.
