= Turalei =

Town and government seat of Twic County, Warrap State, South Sudan

- Town
- Location in South Sudan
- Coordinates: 9.0912°N 28.4308°E
- Country: South Sudan
- Region: Bahr el Ghazal
- State: Warrap
- County: Twic County

Government
  - County commissioner: TBD
- Time zone: UTC+02:00 (CAT)

Turalei is a large town and government seat of Twic County in Warrap State in the Bahr el Ghazal region of South Sudan. The town is the birthplace of many well-known basketball players such as Manute Bol and Ring Ayuel, and Liberation fighters such as Kerbino Kuanyin Bol, Martin Manyiel Ayuel, Dr Justin Yach Arop, and others.

== Location ==
Turalei is located in Warrap State. It is the gubernatorial headquarters of Twic County. Its location is in Turalei Payam in the north of South Sudan near the border with the Republic of the Sudan and the Abyei Area. This location lies about 834 kilometres (518 mi) by road, northwest of Juba, the capital of and largest city in South Sudan.

== History ==
Due to its proximity to the border with Sudan, Turalei suffered extensive destruction during the Second Sudanese Civil War between 1983 and 2005. Efforts have since been underway to assist in the rehabilitation of the settlement, with Manute Bol being involved in some of them. As a result, a hospital was built in the area.

In 2011, as hostilities flared up in neighbouring Abyei, Turalei received an influx of refugees, who overwhelmed local resources. In June 2011, Turalei itself was attacked by militiamen believed to be affiliated with the Khartoum government. Several fatalities were recorded.

== Population ==
The exact population of Turalei is not known but is estimated to be around one hundred thousand. This estimate was gathered from the previous bomas which form Turalei payams. These bomas include Ayen-Amuol, Anyiel-Kuac, Nyiel-Abiel, Pandit-Amuol, Mangok-Amuol, Majak-Aher, and Kac-Beek payams.

== Notable people ==
- Ring Ayuel (born 1988), college basketball player
- Manute Bol (1969–2010), tallest person to play in the NBA

== See also ==
- Abyei
- Aweil
- Gogrial
- Mayom County
