= Awut Deng Acuil =

South Sudanese politician

Awut Deng Achuil
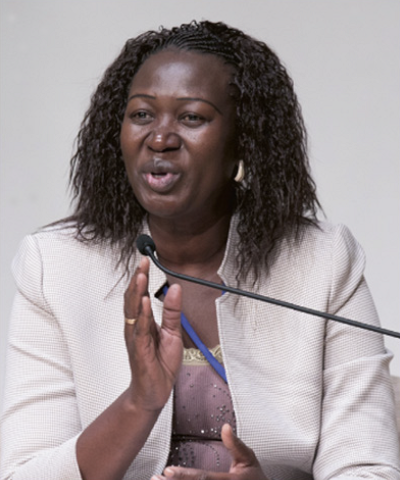

Minister of Foreign Affairs and International Cooperation of South Sudan
- In office 19 Aug 2019 – 12 March 2020
- Preceded by: Nhial Deng Nhial
- Succeeded by: Beatrice Wani-Noah

Personal details
- Born: 1962 South Sudan
- Education: Catholic University of Eastern Africa

Awut Deng Achuil is a South Sudanese politician who serves as the minister of general education and instruction in the Revitalised Transitional Government of National Unity (R-TGoNU). She is the first female Minister of Education for South Sudan and was previously Minister of Foreign Affairs and International Cooperation from August 2019 until March 2020.

== Early life ==
Awut Deng was born the daughter of Deng Achuil. Her father's tribe lived on the Nuer-Dinka border.

== Education ==
Awut has a degree in political sciences from the Catholic University of Eastern Africa.

== Career ==
Early in her career, Awut as a leader of peace efforts. She participated in the New Sudan Council of Churches peace initiative. She was also instrumental in the 1999 Wunlit Peace Conference between the Nuer and Dinka. From 2000 to 2002 Awut traveled the world advocating for peace efforts in South Sudan to various world leaders. She was awarded the 2002 Interaction Humanitarian Award for her efforts for peace.

Awut participated in the peace talks in Kenya from 2002 to 2004 which led to the Comprehensive Peace Agreement in 2005. From 2005 to 2010 she held an appointed position to the Southern Sudan Legislative Assembly in Juba. She also served as a presidential adviser on gender and human rights from 2005 to 2009. Awut cofounded the Sudenese Catholic Bishops Regional Conference, the Sudenese Women's Association in Nairobi, and the Sudenese Women's Voice for Peace.

== Appointment ==
Awut Deng Achuil was appointed by President Salva Kiir as a national minister of General Education and Instructions in March 2020 through a Republican decree.

Awut served as South Sudan's Minister of Labor and Public Service from 2009 to 2011, taking the role previously held by David Deng Athorbe. She was again appointed to the Cabinet of South Sudan on 10 July 2011. She was sworn in as Minister for Labour, Public Service on 14 September 2011. As part of a new cabinet named in April 2016, Acuil was named Minister of Gender, Child and Social Welfare.

Awut has also been a member of parliament since 2010.

Awut served as Foreign Minister from August 2019 until March 2020, when she was replaced by Beatrice Wani-Noah. She was instead named as the new Minister for General Education and Instruction.

== Other activities ==
- Global Partnership for Education (GPE), Alternate Member of the Board of Trustees (since 2020)

== See also ==
- SPLM
- SPLA
- Cabinet of South Sudan
