= Slate Nation =

South Sudanese musician

- Born: Ngot Mou Athuai Thiet Town, Tonj State
- Origin: Juba, South Sudan
- Genres: Folk music, Zouk, Ragga, Dancehall, AfroPop, Kubulo, and Afrobeats
- Occupations: Musician, artist, songwriter
- Instrument: Vocals
- Years active: 2016–present
- Labels: Junubin Starboy Entertainment, Holyland Family Music Empire
- Website: slatenationmusic.com

Ngot Mou Athuai a.k.a. Slate Nation is a South Sudanese-born Australia-based musician, artist and songwriter. He was born in Thiet, a suburb of Tonj State.

== Music career ==
Slate Nation began his music career in 2007 as a choir member in Don Bosco Missionary School in his hometown Tonj. He made his breakthrough with his hit song Juba Juice in 2016. He has collaborated with international acts such as Skales, Pallaso, Jose Chameleone. The artist undertook his second tour of Australia in late 2017. He worked on his fourth studio album expected in 2023, which features work by Chameleone, Skales, Tekno (musician) and Emmanuel Jal. At the beginning of 2022, Slate Nation conducted a world music tour with Rema of Marvin, Kizz Daniel, KiDi.

== Personal life ==
In 2017, while touring Australia, Slate Nation claimed that his life was in danger if he returned to South Sudan. In 2018 December his brother Magontong died in a road accident near Tonj.

== Discography ==
=== Studio albums ===
List of Studio Albums
Title	Year	Label	Format
Leek Ke Yen	2014	Holyland Family Music Empire	Digital download
Nyanbim	2017	Junubin Starboy Entertainment	Digital download
Yiith	2018	Junubin Starboy Entertainment	Digital download

=== Songs ===
Songs
Song title	Year
Come Back Home	2010
Juba Juice	2015
Nyanbim	2016
Girls Dem Hotter Ft. Captain Dollar	2016
Anatabani	2017
Yiith	2017
Panda Awiel	2017
Mading Bor	2017
Dom Achin	2017
Take Me Down	2017
Maath	2017
Yitok	2017
Wuong	2017
Pandum	2017
Piir	2017
Nya Adai	2017
Piandu	2017
Good Girl	2017
Domachin	2018
Nya Adai	2018
Chut Angueem	2018
Beautiful Girl Ft Pallaso	2019
Take Me Down	2019
Panda Awiel	2019
Mading Bor	2019
Inu	2020

== Awards ==
Year	Award	Result	Reference
2015	Fans Choice Awards at MTN Music Awards	Won	,
2016	Best Male Artist at South Theater Academy Awards	Won	
2016	People's Choice Award at South Theater Academy Awards	Won	
2016	Best Collaboration of the year at South Theater Academy Awards	Won	,
2016	Best Song of the year "Juba Juice" at South Theater Academy Awards	Won	
2017	Song of the Year at South Sudan Talent Awards	Won	
2017	Male Artist of the Year at South Sudan Talent Awards	Won	,
2017	Dancehall artist of the year at South Sudan Talent Awards	Won	
2017	Best Collaboration of the year at South Sudan Talent Awards	Won	
2018	Video of the year at South Sudan Talent Youth Awards	Won	,

== See also ==
- Hardlife Avenue Stars
- Ragga jungle
