= Ruweng people =

Indigenous people

The Ruweng are part of South Sudan's larger Padang fraternity found in both South Sudan and northern Sudan. Many have mistakenly claimed that the Ruweng Dinka is not part of Padang. Padang consists of Dongjol, Ageer, Nyiel, Abeliang, Jok, Ruweng, Lual Ngok Abyei and Ngok Lual Yak and Luanyjang. Luannyjang, sometimes known as Luany Agwer Adel shares a similar name with Luach of Agwer Wieu in Korflus, Northern Jonglei. The two Luach, just like the Luach of Atuot, only share the name Luach but have not historical relation other than their larger Dinka identity.

The association of Ngok with Padang was a function of political fiction adopted in 1982 when Kokora politics became a dominant game in South Sudan. It is a mistake that is similar in character to the mistake that Aliab, Ciec, Gok and Atuot are part of Agaar.

Ngok is one of several branches of the Dinka people which consists of Malwal, Ngok, Agaar, Twic, Bor, Padang, Ciec, Aliab and Marbek). The Dinka is the largest Nilotic group in the world.

== Location ==
Located in South Sudan's Ruweng State, the population of the Ruweng is estimated at 260,000. Ruweng State is bordered by Abyei in the west, Twic in the southwest, Nuer in the south, Shilluk in southeast and the Sudan (Nuba Mountains and Misseriya) from the east to northwest.

== Language ==
Ruweng speak the Ruweng Padang Dinka dialect, a subdialect of the Padang dialect of the Dinka language.

== Groups ==
While Ruweng had largely moved away from their Padang identity to establish their own separate identity as Ruweng, this is changing and many people, based on history and culture discerned from songs and oral history are increasingly retracing their Padang root. The Ruweng sometimes call themselves Panaruu, which is a short form of Pan-Ruweng.

The capital of Ruweng State is Pariang. The four major Ruweng groups are Kwel, Awet, Aloor and Paweny (which are found both in Ruweng State and Central Upper Nile State in South Sudan). In Ruweng State, the Ruweng people are divided into 18 chiefdoms. Ruweng of Panaruu are divided into two kwel and awet and together they have 12 subclans. The kwel subclans (wuut) are Kuocgoor, Agaany, Bibiok, Ngeer, Miorcigiu, Bugo Bol, Bugo Angau, Palei, and Tungdiak. The awet subclans are Aniek, Kuok, and Diar. Ruweng of Aloor (or biemnom) has six subclans: Amaal, Majuan, Thieyier, Ngongkiel, Manteng, and Abang.

The Ruweng section known as Paweny, located in the Atar County of Central Upper Nile State, left the mainstream Ruweng in 17th century, although they maintain contact with mainstream Ruweng. They have six subclans. Part of Paweny is still in Ruweng State today and has three subclan s: Buga e Bol, Tungdiak, and Palei.paweny main clans are Aniek that is the largest followed by jueny followed by thiony and finally buga
