= Mayol Kur Akuei =

South Sudanese politician

Mayol Kur Akuei is the current Vice President of Greater Pioneer Operating Company (GPOC). He was the Governor of Ruweng State, South Sudan since 24 December 2015 until January 17, 2017. He is the first governor of the state, which was created by President Salva Kiir on 2 October 2015. On January 17, 2017 Akuei was replaced by Theje D’Aduot Deng as the Governor of Ruweng state.
