= Ring Ayuel =

South Sudanese college basketball player (born 1988)

Personal information
- Born: c. 1988 (age 37–38) Turalei, Sudan (now South Sudan)
- Listed height: 7 ft 3.5 in (2.22 m)

Career information
- High school: Our Savior New American High School
- College: Ohlone College
- NBA draft: 2013: undrafted
- Position: Center

Ring Ayuel (born c. 1988) is a Sudanese former college basketball player. He is one of the tallest basketball players to have played professionally, standing at a height of 7 foot 3½ inches tall (2.22 meters). His height is sometimes disputed as being 7 foot 4 inches tall (2.235 meters).

== Biography ==
Ayuel was born c. 1988 in Turalei, South Sudan, (but which then was in Sudan) the same village where NBA player Manute Bol was born. In 1999, when Ayuel was 11, his Dinka Tribe was invaded by Islamic soldiers. Ayuel and a group of several thousand people journeyed on a walk from their village to safety in northwest Kenya.

Ayuel and the group found themselves in a UN-sponsored refugee camp. Ayuel lived in the camp for five years before being taken to Long Island, New York for education. After his schooling at the age of 21, he met the head basketball coach of Ohlone College.
