= Biem, South Sudan =

Biem
- Village
- Location in South Sudan
- Coordinates: 10°0′N 30°8′E
- Country: South Sudan
- State: Ruweng Administrative Area
- Time zone: UTC+2 (CAT)

Biem is a village in the north of the Ruweng Administrative Area in South Sudan, approximately 70 km northeast of Bentiu. Biem is located north of the Bahr al -Arab River and is inhabited mainly by cattle.

The village is located in the area of oil deposits of Heglig. During the Second Sudanese Civil War, Biem was affected, not least because of its proximity to the border with the northern Sudan but because of its oil fields. This resulted in hunger among the local population and disease. Biem was under the control of the Sudan People's Liberation Army and became a haven for them. In 1999, government forces destroyed the village in a campaign.
