= Bahr al-Arab =

Coordinates: 9°2′N 29°28′E

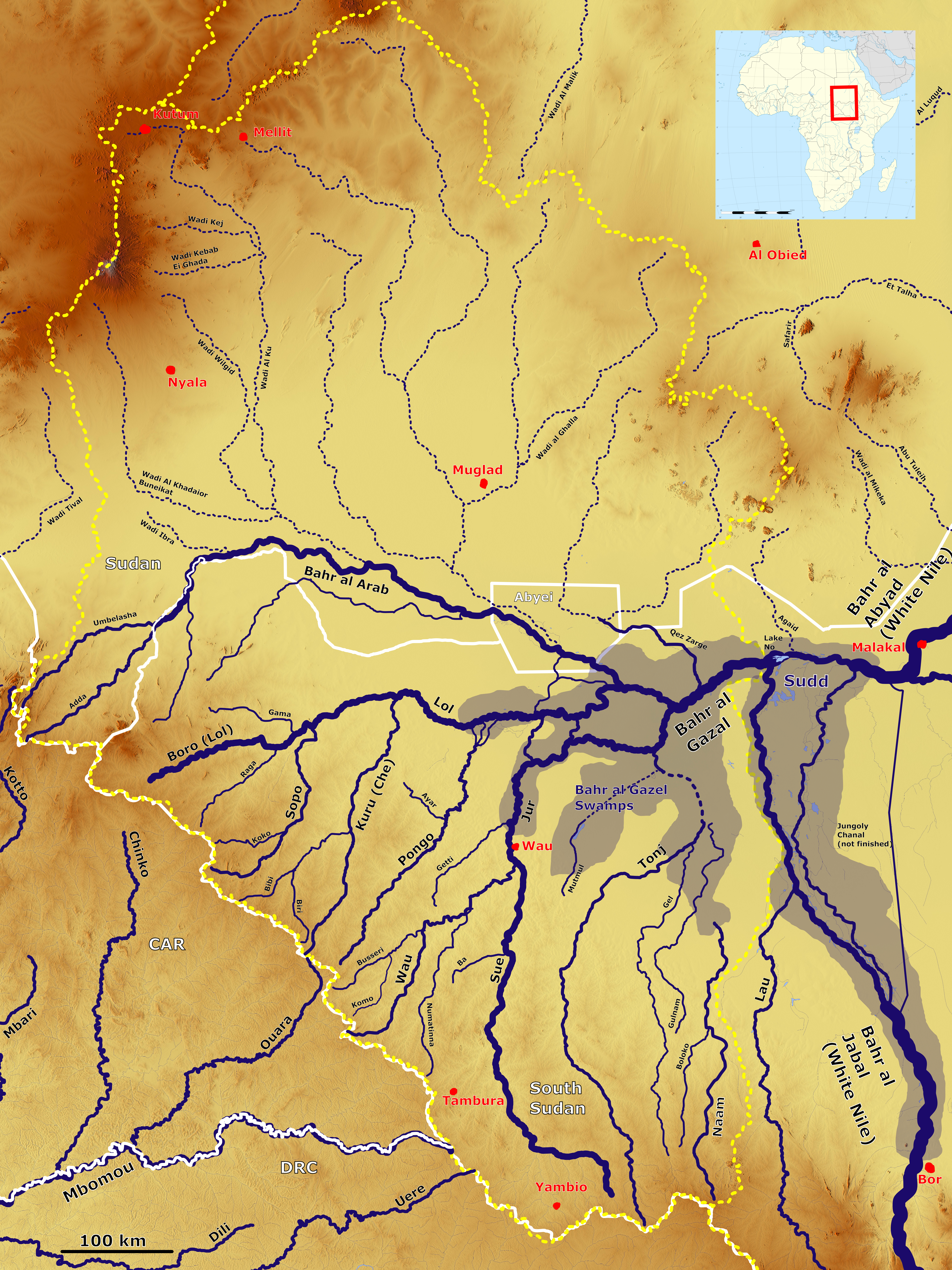
- Native name: بحر العرب (Arabic)

Location
- Country: Sudan, South Sudan

Physical characteristics
- Source
  - location: Bongo Massif
- Mouth
  - location: Bahr el Ghazal River
- Length: 800 km (500 mi)

The Bahr al-Arab (Arabic: بحر العرب) or Kiir River (Dinka) is a river which flows approximately 800 km (500 mi) through the southwest of Sudan and marks part of its international border with South Sudan. It is part of the Nile river system, being a tributary of Bahr el Ghazal, which is a tributary of the White Nile.

The river flows through Sudan's Kurdufan and Darfur regions and forms part of the border between Darfur and the region of Bahr el Ghazal in northwestern South Sudan. For centuries the Bahr al-Arab has marked the boundary between the Dinka and Baggara ethnic groups. The river has served as a frontier and zone of conflict between the Baggara and Dinka peoples since their oral traditions began.

== Etymology ==
The name "Bahr al-Arab" is Arabic for "Sea of the Arabs" (possibly from "Nahr al-Arab", Arabic for "River of the Arabs"). The Dinka people call it the "Kiir River".

== Course ==
The Bahr al-Arab arises from several tributaries that drain the Bongo Massif and Marrah Mountains in Darfur, close to Sudan's border with Chad and the Central African Republic. The Adda and Umbelasha flow east from the Bongo Massif to join the Ibrah (Wadi Ibra), which flows south from the Marrah Mountains. Formed from these tributaries, the Bahr al-Arab flows east along the border of the Darfur and Bahr el Ghazal regions, then through a southern part of the Kurdufan region.

According to some sources, the Bahr al-Arab's confluence with the Jur River marks the source of the Bahr el Ghazal River. Other sources say the Jur joins the Bahr el Ghazal before the Bahr al-Arab does. The Bahr el Ghazal flows a short distance east to join the White Nile in the Sudd wetlands. The Lol River joins the Bahr al-Arab from the south, just above the Jur River confluence.

The Bahr al-Arab has the largest drainage basin of any river in the Bahr el Ghazal region. But compared to the rivers to the south, the Bahr al-Arab has very little water and it flows sluggishly.

== History ==
During the Second Sudanese Civil War, Bahr al-Arab's location on the border between Northern and Southern Sudan made it a military front and an area of conflict. In the early 1980s western Sudan suffered several droughts and crop failures. As various peoples shifted southward the Baggara moved south of the Bahr al-Arab and came into conflict with the Dinka. The Baggara were supported by the Sudanese military in an attempt to make headway against the Sudan People's Liberation Army (SPLA). The Baggara militias, known as murahileen, battled the SPLA throughout the 1980s. By the end of the decade the land along the Bahr al-Arab was devastated and the population decimated.

== See also ==
- List of rivers of Sudan
- List of rivers of South Sudan
- Biem, South Sudan
