= Hardlife Avenue Stars =

South Sudanese Afro-pop and dance group

Hardlife Avenue Stars is a South Sudanese Afro-pop and dance group. Vocalist Siliman Musa (Nicky Prince) and the late rapper Murye Alex (Mantani) who died on 24 July 2021 in a motor road accident; formed the group in South Sudan in 2011. Initially a duo, Ochwo Junior (Linus) then joined in 2016 after a series of collaborations with Kilo Kwen Kulek, offside and Yau De. The group now survived with Nicky Prince and Linus as a duo.

== Background ==
Hardlife Avenue Stars released their debut studio album Lost Culture in 2012. Their second studio album Yau De was released on 4 November 2014, earning the group a number of accolades and nominations. On 3 April 2015, the group completed their first album launch dubbed “Yau De,” establishing them as a household name in South Sudan. The band had successful tours in South Sudan and part of Uganda's West Nile Region, claiming a huge attention with their videos being played on Ugandan charts on both television and radio.

== Discography ==
The Hardlife Avenue Stars have done tremendous record breaking performance with several songs released continually. Among the top list of songs, below are some of the tracks trending in all the streets of South Sudan and beyond.

- Ana Yau Bi Arif Album
- Lost Culture 2011
- Yau De 2014
- Mr. Right 2017
- Fi Dom Tai 2022
- Lene Baan

== History ==
The band was formed in 2011 by Nicky Prince and Murye Alex, popularly known as Mantani. They met through Mantani's brother who was a fan of Prince's high school a cappella group. At that time he returned from Khartoum, Sudan and had wanted to form a group; that led to them collectively agreeing on the name “Hardlife Avenue” as a reference to the difficulty of their childhood struggles.

The group ventured into artist management with signings like JERO OV Hardlife.

Hardlife Avenue Stars lost one of its members, Mantani, in a motorcycle accident in Uganda in 2021.

== Members ==
1. Nicky Prince as the CEO and lead performer 2. Linus as the lead performer and production director 3. Jero as a member 4. Slaughterman Di Panga as team leader for production 5. MD the teacher as a member

- Controversies

Hardlife Avenue Stars initially signed with Rockstars Records.

== Awards ==
- MTN/EYE Radio Awards 2015; Overall Hit Song of the Year - Yau De
- D.V.A Awards 2015; Best Video.
- South Sudan Talented Youth Award (SSTYA) 201/2018; Best crew.
- South Sudan Talented Youth Award (SSTYA) 2017/2018; Best video for the year.
- South Sudan Talented Youth Award (SSTYA) 2017/2108; Best song of the year.
