= Abraham Gum Makuach =

South Sudanese politician

Victor Atem Atem was the Governor of Gogrial State, South Sudan since 19 December 2017 He was the first governor of the state, which was created by President Salva Kiir on 2 October 2015. He held the office until 3 January 2017, when he was replaced by Gregory Deng Kuac Aduol.
