= Nhial Deng Nhial =

South Sudanese military commander and politician

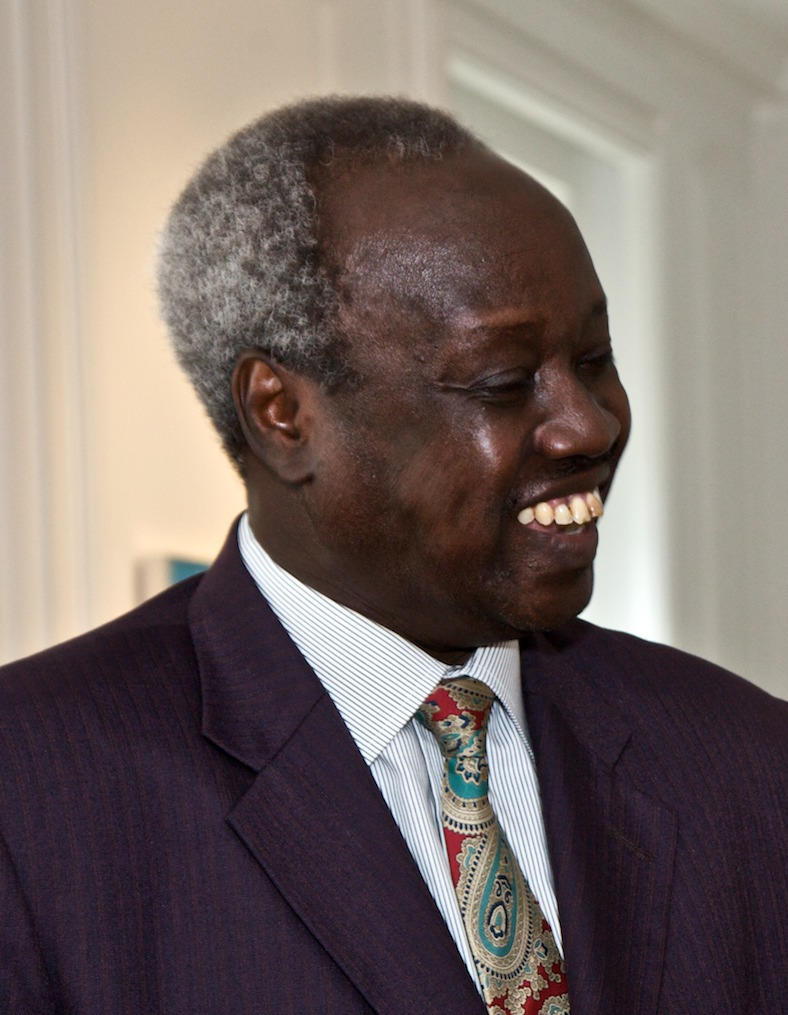

Minister of Foreign Affairs and International Cooperation of South Sudan
- In office 2011–2013
- Preceded by: Deng Alor Kuol
- Succeeded by: Barnaba Marial Benjamin
- In office 2018–2019
- Preceded by: Deng Alor Kuol
- Succeeded by: Awut Deng Acuil

Minister of Defence of South Sudan
- In office December 2008 – August 2011
- Preceded by: Dominic Dim Deng
- Succeeded by: John Kong

Personal details
- Parent: William Deng Nhial
- Education: University of Khartoum (LLB); University of Dundee (LLM)
- Occupation: lawyer, politician

Lieutenant General Nhial Deng Nhial is a South Sudanese politician and a member of the ruling Sudan People's Liberation Movement (SPLM), born in May 1957. He was Minister of Foreign Affairs 2011 to 2013 and 2018 to 2019 after having served as the caretaker Minister of Defense since 10 July 2011. Prior to that he served as the pre-independence South Sudanese Minister of SPLA and Veteran Affairs, from 22 December 2008 until 9 July 2011.

== Biography ==
Nhial Deng is a Dinka from Thony of Tonj South County, Warrap State, Bahr el Ghazal region of South Sudan. He is the son of the famous late leader William Deng Nhial who was assassinated in 1968 before the Addis Ababa Agreement was signed between Sudan and South Sudan in Ethiopia, in 1972. William Deng Nhial was as thoughtful as John Garang was. His son Nhial Deng Nhial did not join the movement as a member of an average Southern Sudanese family, he came from a home of a politician and was familiar with the grief of losing his father when he was young. He is a man of honor and he has committed his life to the liberation of South Sudan as a member of the Sudan People's Liberation Movement and of the Sudan People's Liberation Army. Nhial joined the SPLA right after its inception in 1983. He was closely associated with the drafting and negotiation of the Comprehensive Peace Agreement between the Republic of Sudan and South Sudan, which was signed in Naivasha, Kenya, in January 2005.

=== Education ===
Nhial completed his early education at Comboni College in Khartoum, Sudan. He then entered the University of Khartoum to study law. He graduated in the early 1980s with a Bachelor of Laws and earned a Master of Laws from the University of Dundee in the United Kingdom in 2008. He is fluent in both English and Arabic. There are South Sudanese media reports, yet unconfirmed, that following the conclusion of the Naivasha Agreement, Nhial was slated to become the Sudanese Foreign Minister in the Government of National Unity. However following the death of John Garang in a plane crash in July 2005, Nhial refused entreaties to serve in Khartoum and opted to work in the nascent Government of South Sudan (GOSS). Nhial Deng Nhial declared his suspension of membership in the SPLM and the establishment of the South Sudan Salvation Movement (SSSM) on October 15, 2025. He declared that the new Movement is a tool to reform the SPLM and return it to its original vision.

== Role in the government of Southern Sudan ==
Nhial was appointed Minister of Regional Affairs in the Southern Sudanese cabinet in 2005 by President Salva Kiir. He however abruptly resigned from the cabinet less than six months later. There has been speculation as to what led to that resignation, with no clear reason being fronted.

In 2004, rumors soared across Southern Sudan that John Garang was planning to dismiss Salva Kiir as his deputy and replace him with Nhial. However, at a meeting of SPLA top brass held in Rumbek, in December 2004, one month before the signing of the CPA, Garang made it clear that those speculations were just that; only speculations, without any basis for truth.

In December 2008, Nhial was appointed Minister of SPLA and Veterans Affairs by President Salva Kiir, replacing Dominic Dim Deng who died in a plane crash on 2 May 2008. He returned to the South Sudanese cabinet with the military rank of Lieutenant General in the SPLA. Following the independence of South Sudan on 9 July 2011, Nhial Deng Nhial was appointed Caretaker Minister of Defense of the Republic of South Sudan. On 26 August 2011, President Salva Kiir unveiled his long-awaited cabinet with Nhial appointed as the minister of foreign affairs and international cooperation of the Republic of South Sudan.

In 2020, President Salva Kiir appointed Nhial as minister of presidential affairs in the revitalized government of national unity.

He is a member of the SPLM's highest organ, the Political Bureau, and served as the leader of the SPLM delegation in Naivasha peace talks.

== Photos ==
- Flickr.com: Photo of Lieutenant General Nhial Deng Nhial, South Sudanese Defense Minister
- Another Photo of Lt. General Nhial Deng Nhial, Also At Flickr.com

== See also ==
- SPLM
- SPLA
- University of Khartoum
- Cabinet of South Sudan
