= Sudan Council of Churches =

Church organisation

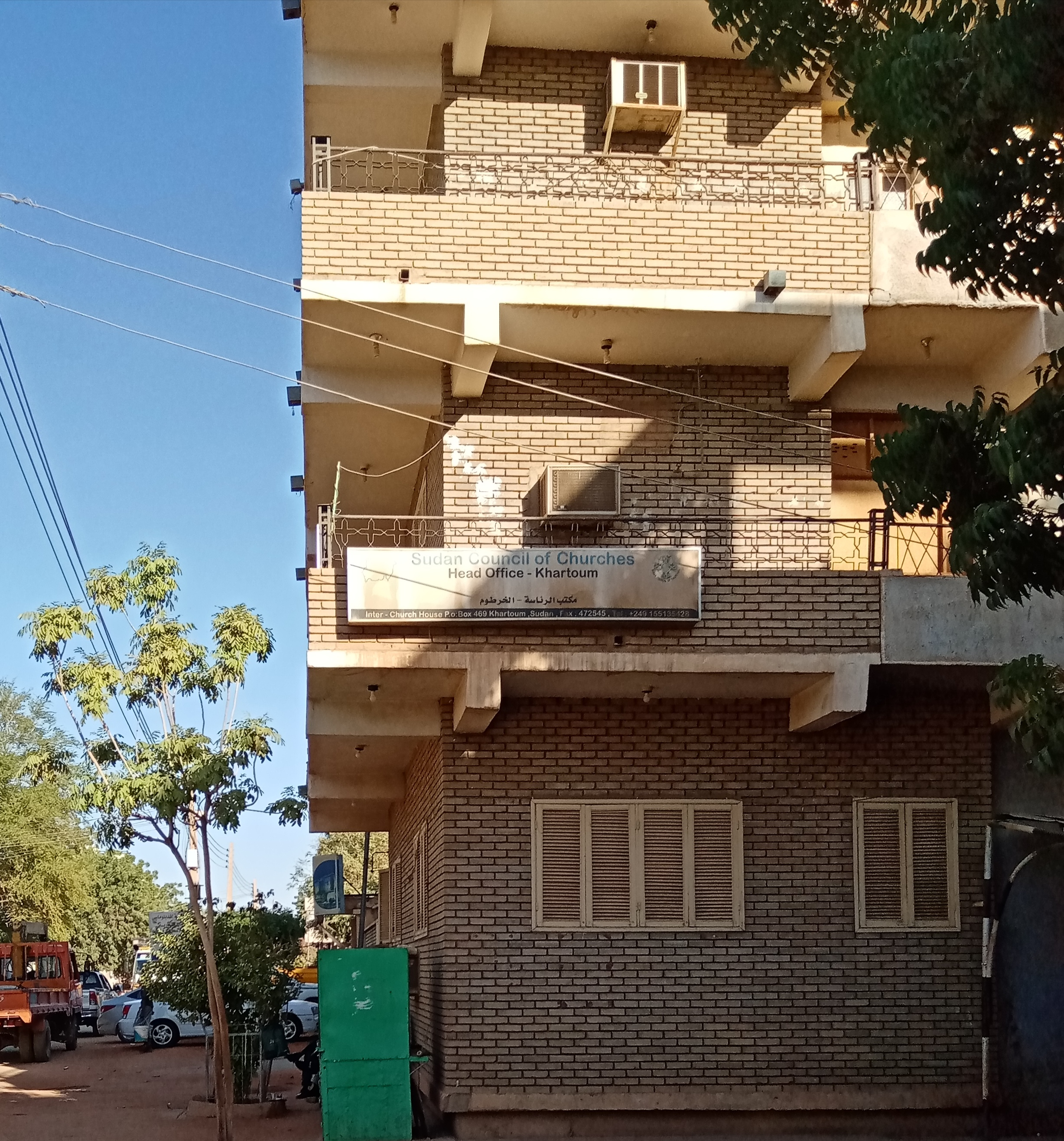
Sudan Council of Churches

The New Sudan Council of Churches (NSCC) is an organization comprising six churches located in Southern Sudan: the Roman Catholic Church, Episcopal Church of the Sudan, Presbyterian Church of Sudan, African Inland Church, Sudan Pentecostal Church, and Sudan Interior Church. Formed in 1989–1990 under Bishop Paride Taban, the NSCC has acted as a facilitator in peace negotiations during the Second Sudanese Civil War. Along with its stated goal of Christian fellowship, it is active in reconciliation advocacy and human rights.

The NSCC most widely reported success was the negotiation of an end to inter-ethnic fighting among Nuer in 1999. The Wunlit negotiations led to the creation of the South Sudan Liberation Movement, which declared itself neutral in the conflict. According to John Prendergast of the International Crisis Group, what progress has been made in reconciling the factions that resulted when Riek Machar and Lam Akol's defected from the Sudan People's Liberation Army (SPLA) in 1994 is largely the result of the work of the NSCC. However, the European-Sudanese Public Affairs Council, an organization that largely takes a pro-government stance, states that the NSCC is overly entangled with the political leadership and goals of the SPLA.

It is a member of the Fellowship of Christian Councils and Churches in the Great Lakes and Horn of Africa.
