= Pariang =

Panrieng
- Town
- Location in South Sudan
- Coordinates: 9°55′N 29°59′E
- Country: South Sudan
- State: Ruweng Administrative Area
- County: Panrieng County
- Time zone: UTC+2 (CAT)

Panrieng is a town in South Sudan that serves as the administrative headquarters of the Ruweng Administrative Area.
