= Jur River =

River in South Sudan

Luo
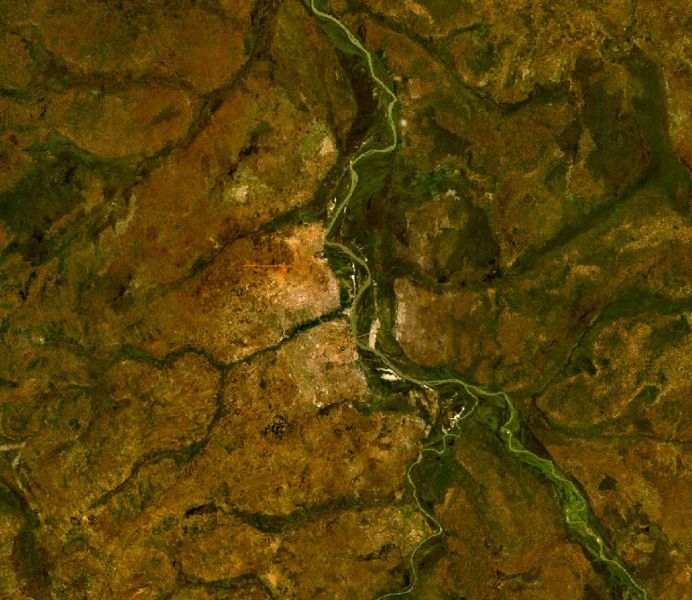

- Location of mouth in South Sudan

Location
- Country: South Sudan

Physical characteristics
- Source: Jur River
  - location: Ibba, Western Equatoria
  - coordinates: 4°22′12″N 29°15′25″E
  - elevation: c. 428 m (1,404 ft) above sea level
- Mouth: Bahr el Ghazal River
  - location: Tonj North, Warrap
  - coordinates: 8°39′0″N 29°18′0″E
  - elevation: 392 m (1,286 ft)
- Length: 485 km (301 mi)
- Basin size: 61,000 km^{2} (24,000 sq mi)
- Discharge
  - average: maximum 14,300 cubic feet per second (400 m^{3}/s) in September

The Jur River ( Luo River) is a river in western South Sudan, flowing through the Bahr el Ghazal and Equatoria regions. About 485 kilometres (301 mi) long, it flows north and northeast, joining the Bahr el Ghazal River on the western side of the Sudd wetlands. The Jur River (Luo River) is part of the Nile basin, as the Bahr al-Ghazal flows into the White Nile.

The Luo River is a seasonal stream. Its discharge can reach 400 m^{3}/s (14,300 cu ft/s) in September.

The upper course of the Luo River is also called the Sue.

== Course ==
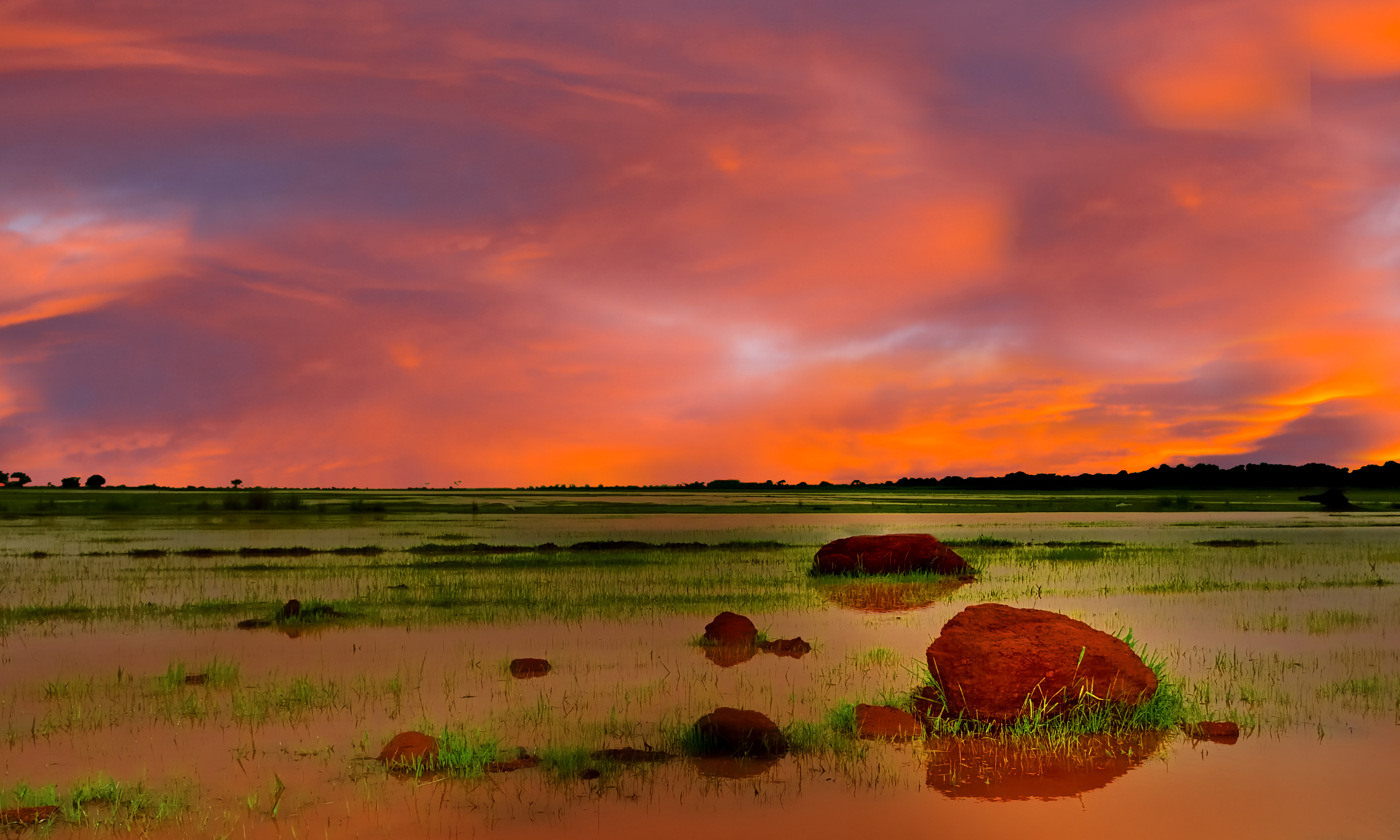
Wetlands of the Jur River in Western Bahr el Ghazal

The Jur River's headwaters flow from the Congo-Nile Divide, which separates the Nile and Congo River basins, along South Sudan's border with the Democratic Republic of the Congo and the Central African Republic. The main tributaries being the Sue River (itself sometimes called the Jur), Busseri River, Wau River, and Numatinna River. The spelling and precise meaning of these river names differ among sources. The tributaries come together near Wau, the capital of the state of Western Bahr el Ghazal.

Below Wau the Jur River bends eastward, entering the swampy Sudd region. Due to the nature of the wetlands it is not always clear whether one river flows into another or merely merges in the general Sudd swamps. Some sources cite the Lol River as a tributary of the Jur while others do not. Some sources say the Jur joins the Bahr al-Arab and the confluence marks the start of the Bahr el Ghazal, but more recent sources say that the Jur joins the Bahr el Ghazal at Lake Ambadi and that the Bahr al-Arab joins the Bahr el Ghazal some distance downriver from Lake Ambadi.

According to author Mamdouh Shahin, the Lol, Jur, Tonj, Bahr al-Arab, and others streams, are all tributaries of the Bahr el Ghazal, but that their channels disappear in the wetlands before reaching any outlet.

== History ==
Among the ethnic groups living in the Jur basin are the Dinka, and Luo who call themselves Jo-luo. "Jur" is a Dinka word for "alien" or "non-Dinka".

The Jur River was explored by John Petherick between 1853 and 1865. In 1897–98 the Jur River was carefully surveyed throughout its course by Lieutenant A.H. Dyé and other members of a French mission under Jean-Baptiste Marchand during the Scramble for Africa.

In 1969, during the First Sudanese Civil War, a Zande rebel movement called the Sue River Revolutionary Government formed along the Sue River stretch of the Jur.

== See also ==
- List of rivers of South Sudan
