= Gogrial West County =

- County
- Counties in Warrap
- Country: South Sudan
- Region: Bahr el Ghazal
- State: Warrap State

Area
  - Total: 1,698 sq mi (4,399 km^{2})

Population (2017 estimate)
  - Total: 346,370
  - Density: 203.9/sq mi (78.74/km^{2})
- Time zone: UTC+2 (CAT)

Gogrial West County is an administrative county in Warrap State, in the Bahr el Ghazal region of South Sudan.

== History ==
In 2020, South Sudan reverted to back to having a 10 state, 3 administrative area, and 79 counties system.
