= Tonj South County =

- County
- Counties in Warrap
- Country: South Sudan
- Region: Bahr el Ghazal
- State: Warrap State

Area
  - Total: 2,866 sq mi (7,424 km^{2})

Population (2017 estimate)
  - Total: 122,816
  - Density: 42.85/sq mi (16.54/km^{2})
- Time zone: UTC+2 (CAT)

Tonj South County is an administrative area in Warrap State, in the Bahr el Ghazal region of South Sudan.

Tonj South County hosts Tonj Town. Tonj Town centre is a historical place that was established and made to be the headquarters of the former Jur River District 1902. The former Jur River District with its headquarters in Tonj town included the region of Abyei, Gogrial and Gok Arol Community. Gok Arol community was taken away from Jur River administration to Rumbek by 1946.

Tonj is known with its 5 names which are: Tonj, Kalkuel, Genanyuon, Gen-ngeu and Jur Katash. However, in the current time Tonj and Kalkuel are taking the lead as the formal reference to the area while the rest of the names are informally used. The current Tonj South County was formally referred to as Thiet Rural Council in 1960s to 1980s by government authorities under various Khartoum Regimes.

However, the Sudan People Liberation Movement & Army (SPLM/A) during the war of liberation referred this administrative area as Thiet Payam. In 2004 Dr. John Garang De Mabior the then SPLM Chairman split Tonj County under New Sudan administrative areas as an independent county resulting into the birth of Tonj North County the former Liil Rural Council and Tonj East County which was formally known as Riangnhom Rural Council.

The people of Abyei broke away from Tonj Administration 1905 and the Gogrial District broke away from Jur River District - headquartered in Tonj town by 1922. When Jur River split into two 1922 the name Tonj District began to be used.

The current Tonj South County is made up of the following communities:

1. Apuk Jurwiir
2. Yar Ayiei Cikom
3. Muok Akot Wut
4. Thony Amon Marol
5. Bongo Community
6. Malual Karthiith

Tonj South is the community of William Deng Nhial (1929 - 5 May 1968)[1] who was the political leader of the Sudan African National Union, SANU, from 1962 to 1968. and Nhial Deng Nhial, senior political figure in South Sudan.
