= Tonj North County =

- County
- Counties in Warrap
- Country: South Sudan
- Region: Bahr el Ghazal
- State: Warrap State

Area
  - Total: 4,337 sq mi (11,232 km^{2})

Population (2017 estimate)
  - Total: 234,593
  - Density: 54.095/sq mi (20.886/km^{2})
- Time zone: UTC+2 (CAT)

Tonj North County is an administrative area in Warrap State, in the Bahr el Ghazal region of South Sudan.

Tonj North was divided into 9 payams before the creation of the 32-state system. Currently the county consists of 16 payams. The former payams of Tonj North were granted county status.

Administrative divisions

1. Alabek Payam
2. Majak Payam
3. Akop Payam
4. Awul Payam
5. Kirik Payam
6. Kuacnyel Payam
7. Abilnyang Payam
8. Rorkou Payam
9. Manloor Payam
10. Makuok Payam
11. Pankot Payam
12. Warrap Payam
13. Marial Lou Payam
14. Pagol Payam
15. Rualbet Payam
16. Patei Payam

Communities

1. Lou Paher
2. Awan Parek
3. Apuk Padoc
4. Konggor Arop Akol
5. Lou Mawien Ariik
6. Atok Buk Alok
7. Noi Ayii Kuot
8. Leer Akeen Koor
9. Nyang Akoc Majok
10. Abiem Mayar Mareng
11. Abuok Ayom

Commissioners

1. Lewis Anei Madut Kuendit - 2004
2. Akol Koor Kuc - from 2004 to 2005
3. Acuil Akol Magardit - from 2007 to 2008
4. Yol Mayar Mareng
5. Deng Ayieny Aleu
6. Diu Ayii Kon - from 2008 to 2013
7. Marko Awuoc Kuot - from 2013 to 2014
8. Sigin Ayii Kuot - from 2015 to 2016
9. Kuol Akoon Kuol - 2021 to May 2022
