= Warrap (state) =

State of South Sudan

Warrap Warab
- State
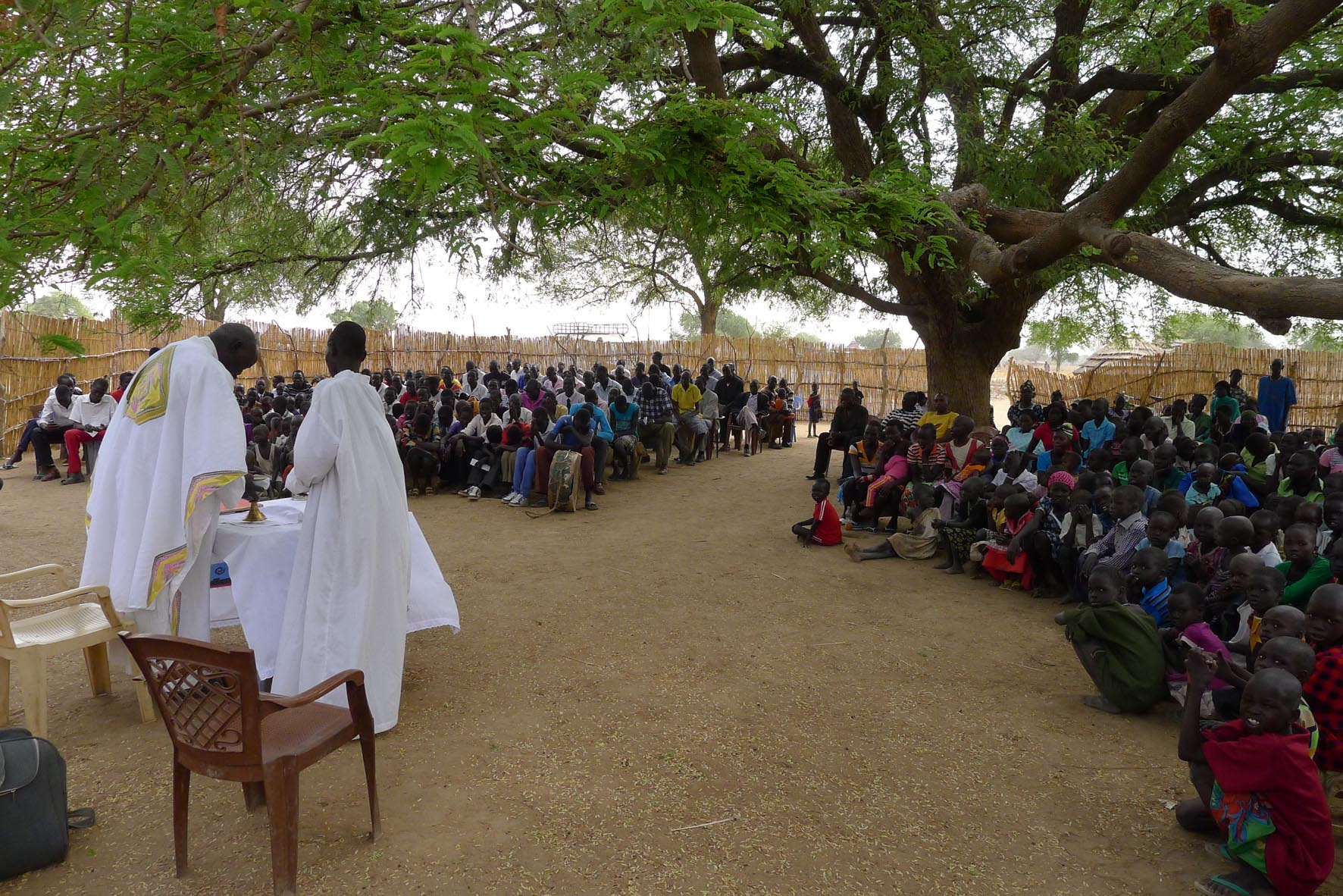
- Roman Catholic ceremony in Warrap

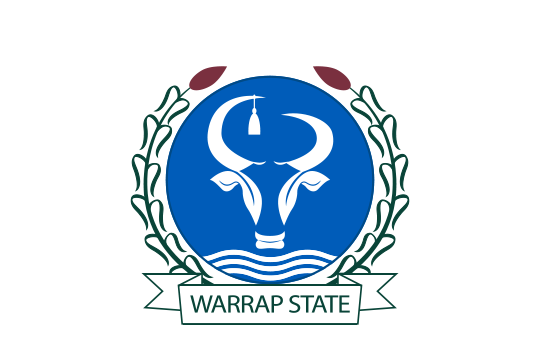
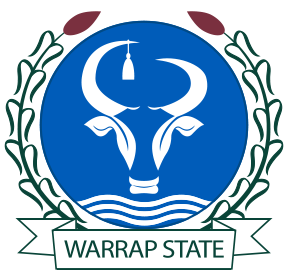
- Flag Seal

- Location in South Sudan
- Coordinates: 08°10′N 28°04′E
- Country: South Sudan
- Region: Bahr el Ghazal
- Established: 2020
- Capital: Kuajok

Government
  - Governor: H.E. Amb. Bol Wek Agoth

Area
  - Total: 45,567.24 km^{2} (17,593.61 sq mi)

Population (2017 estimate)
  - Total: 1,379,960
  - Density: 30.2840/km^{2} (78.4353/sq mi)
- Time zone: UTC+2 (CAT)
- HDI (2021): 0.311 low · 9th of 10
- Website: warrap.gov.ss

Warrap is a state in South Sudan. Warrap is located in the Bahr el Ghazal region of northwestern South Sudan. The state comprises six counties, Tonj South County, Tonj North County, Tonj East county, Gogrial East County, Gogrial West County and Twic County. Kuajok is the capital city.

The current governor is H.E. Amb. Bol Wek Agoth who replaced Gen. Magok Magok Deng after his relief in 2023.

== History ==
Warrap was seceded from Bahr al-Ghazal as a separate state in February 1994. According to opponents of the Sudanese government, the new state was established as a concession to George Kongor Arop, who became second vice president that year and came from the village of Warrap.

The state was first established in 2005 following the signing of the Comprehensive Peace Agreement between the Sudan People's Liberation Movement (SPLM) led by Dr. John Garang de Mabior and the Government of Sudan under the leadership of president Omar Hassan El Bashir. It subsequently became part of South Sudan after a successful secession from Sudan on 9 July 2011.

In 2015, a presidential decree established a new system of 28 states, replacing the previously established 10. Warrap State was replaced by the states of Twic, Gogrial and Tonj. Warrap State was re-established by a peace agreement signed on 22 February 2020.

=== List of Governors ===
- Aleu Ayieny Aleu (January 2021 — November 2022)
- Manhiem Bol Malek (November 2022 — November 2023)
- Kuol Muor Muor (November 2023 — present)

== Overview ==
Counties in Warrap

Warrap State comprises an area of 31,027 km². Kuajok is the capital of Warrap state. All states in South Sudan are divided into counties, each headed by a County Commissioner appointed by the President of the Republic of South Sudan

County	Area (km^{2})	Population Census 2008	County Commissioner
Gogrial East	3,890.55	103,283	Maluach Malueth
Gogrial West	4,754.37	243,921	Makuc Aruol Luach
Tonj South	7,449.73	86,592	Nhial Deng Nhial (Acting)
Tonj North	11,012.05	165,222	Kuol Akoon Kuol
Tonj East	3,990.61	116,122	John Deng Kok
Twic	3,922.65	204,905	Deng Tong Goch

== Location ==
Warrap State is in the Bahr el Ghazal region. To its north lies the disputed region of Abyei, to its east lies Unity State. To the west is Western Bahr el Ghazal and Northern Bahr el Ghazal, and to its south lies the Lakes State.

== Government ==
The state constitution was adopted in 2008. Lewis Anei Madut-Kuendit was the first governor of the state and Bol Wek Agoth is the current governor of Warrap state.

== Religion ==
The main religions in Warrap State are traditional African religions and Christianity (Catholicism, Protestantism).

== Notable figures ==
- Kerubino Kuanyin Bol (1948–1999), rebel commander who was one of the founders of SPLA/M
- Manute Bol (1962–2010), tallest NBA player of all time
- Peter Mayen, politician
- Slate Nation, musician
- Nhial Deng Nhial (politician)
- Salva Kiir (president of South Sudan)
- Mayiik Ayii Deng (politician)
- Awut Deng Acuil (politician)
- Madut Kon Awan, politician
- Alek Wek (born 1977), model
