= Abortion in South Sudan =

In South Sudan, abortion is illegal unless the pregnancy threatens the life of the mother. Illegal abortions are punishable by fines and prison, with shortened sentences if the abortion is done to protect honor. Unsafe abortion is common and contributes to the country's high maternal mortality rate. Most abortions in the country are self-induced, while others are received from unsafe private medical providers. Norms favoring large families and high birth rates contribute to a taboo against abortion in the country. The culture of the Dinka people prohibits abortion unless the woman has had pregnancy-related health problems. Post-abortion care is uncommon in the country.

Before 2008, South Sudan followed Sudan's abortion law, which permitted abortions in cases of risk to life or pregnancy from rape or incest. During the Second Sudanese Civil War, the Sudanese People's Liberation Army and its post-war successor, the Sudanese People's Liberation Movement, implemented pro-natalist policies and opposed family planning. The post-war government implemented a 2008 abortion law that was more restrictive than the previous one, permitting abortion only for life-threatening pregnancies. After South Sudan gained full independence, the Ministry of Health, led by international organizations, supported family planning, going against the pro-natalist view, and a post-abortion care policy was implemented in 2014. Still, the abortion debate did not commonly feature in public discourse, and reproductive health groups avoided the subject. The outbreak of the South Sudanese Civil War led to wartime rape and other factors that contributed to abortions.

== Legislation ==
Under the penal code of South Sudan, abortion is a criminal offense unless "done in good faith for the purpose of saving the life of the mother". There is also an exception if the fetus is already dead. Under Article 216, receiving an abortion is punishable by a fine and a prison sentence of up to seven years, which is decreased to three years if "committed by an unmarried pregnant woman in order to avoid shame". The same article punishes providers with a fine and a prison sentence of up to three years. The maximum sentence is increased to ten years in cases of forced abortion or abortion resulting in death, according to Articles 217 and 218, respectively. Article 219 says that unintentionally causing a miscarriage by using force against a woman known to be pregnant is punishable by a fine and up to five years. As of 2016, many people in South Sudan are aware of the law permitting life-saving abortions, while many others believe abortion is totally banned.

== History ==
During the Second Sudanese Civil War, the Sudan People's Liberation Army (SPLA) supported pro-natalist policies as part of its nation-building and war effort. The SPLA's encouragement of high birth rates led to wartime rape in the 1980s and 1990s; this contributed to a high abortion rate, estimated to be 35% in 1999. After the war, the Sudan People's Liberation Movement—the ruling political party, formed from the SPLA—emphasized population growth, to replace the population loss from the war, as part of nation-building, thus discouraging family planning. Around 2005, political leaders shut down the only family planning group based in South Sudan, stating that it was funded by Sudan.

In 2008, the autonomous government of South Sudan made its abortion law more restrictive, despite other laws becoming more liberal. This law permitted abortion only on the grounds of risk to life, while Sudan's abortion law had the additional grounds of rape and incest. Reproductive health advocates did not voice their opposition to this law, but, beginning in 2006, they supported family planning policy development by non-governmental organizations such as MSI Reproductive Choices, Ipas, and Jhpiego. After independence in 2011, the policies of the new Ministry of Health were led by foreign donors and organizations such as the World Health Organization and the World Bank. The Ministry of Health supported international health commitments and drafted policies on reproductive health, including post-abortion care (PAC), which was seen as a topic that could be promoted as life-saving without addressing abortion itself. The Ministry of Health led studies on public attitudes toward family planning, finding that birth control and abortion were widely viewed as results of foreign cultural influence. The ministry's first family planning policy framed reproductive healthcare as something to be rebuilt after the war, thus counteracting the pro-natalist view.

Despite policies favoring family planning, there was little public debate about the subject, and no women's rights groups participated in the abortion debate. Abortion was occasionally the subject of media reports, such as a 2012 newspaper article about a politician who had unlawfully detained workers of a private health clinic on charges of performing an illegal abortion on his relative. The politician said, "I demanded to know why she was in a private clinic instead of a civil hospital"; this, according to researchers Jennifer J. Palmer and Katerini Storeng, was meant to show support for government control of health. Policies on family planning and PAC were announced in July 2014 by President Salva Kiir. Reproductive health groups avoided mentioning abortion and PAC to donors as the subject was controversial among the South Sudanese government and American funding sources. The South Sudanese government distrusted NGOs that operated outside of its power, and it revoked MSI's authorization to operate in the country in 2015. Discourse among bloggers has argued that the lack of a coherent government stance on reproductive health must be reconciled. Internet users have also protested against post-abortion care services funded by international donors.

During the South Sudanese Civil War (2013–2020), abortion was widely reported at UN-led refugee camps, which the UN attributed largely to rape. Societal changes during the war contributed to increased acceptance of factors motivating abortion, according to a 2022 study of a refugee camp in Juba. These factors included an increase in rape due to the war; an increase in transactional sex among women whose male family members, the traditional financial providers, were killed or drafted; and a shift in marriage traditions making it increasingly likely for women's families to reject grooms whose families could not afford a desired bride price, which meant many unmarried pregnant women did not end up married. The Ministry of Health's reproductive health plans published in 2019 included birth control and PAC. The war and a lack of government funding hindered implementation.

== Prevalence ==
In 2015–2019, the estimated annual number of abortions in South Sudan was 63,600, equating to 46% of unintended pregnancies or 12% of all pregnancies. The abortion rate had remained stagnant since 1990–1994, during which time the unintended pregnancy rate had declined by 35%. Abortion is practiced among all ethnic groups of South Sudan. Unsafe abortion contributes to South Sudan's maternal mortality rate, one of the highest in the world. As of 2025, it causes 10% of maternal mortality in the country.

Most abortions in the country are self-induced and performed so as to appear to be miscarriages. Such methods include the insertion of objects into the vagina and the consumption of bitter plants, medications, detergent, battery acid, or gasoline. Methods favored by the Dinka people include the antimalarial medication chloroquine and the bitter root of mahogany, while other methods involve physical force. Some abortions are unsuccessful and result in babies with birth defects. Abortions from private medical providers are also common, often resulting in complications that require treatment.

South Sudan has a high fertility rate, with social norms favoring very large families. Having babies is encouraged to replace the population killed in war, to create future soldiers, or to grow one's ethnic group. Such views contribute to a taboo against contraception and abortion. Use of birth control is low—with only 1.2% of women using biomedical methods, as of 2010—contributing to abortions. Unmarried women who get pregnant are often urged to marry their partners, and abortions often occur when a woman or her family wants to avoid such a marriage. Dinka culture forbids abortion, but abortions are accepted in the case that a woman has had so many births as to cause reproductive health issues, referred to as a "broken back" (duony kou). Other motives for abortions include extramarital sex, adolescent pregnancy, and cases where go against norms and choose not to have additional children. Dinka culture considers it unlucky for a pregnant woman to walk in the same place as a woman who has had an abortion or miscarriage, and remedies exist for such cases.

Availability of post-abortion care (PAC) in South Sudan is limited, with some health facilities not allowing it. The country's largest referral hospital, Juba Teaching Hospital, has 2,000 PAC patients per year, as of 2020. Post-abortion contraception is available but uncommon. Providers of abortion services often face intimidation. To avoid repercussions, many women in Juba and other cities seek abortion or PAC from private facilities, including some run by foreigners. The government implemented PAC guidelines in 2024 with support from the World Health Organization.

== See also ==
- Abortion in Africa
- Health in South Sudan
- Human rights in South Sudan
