= List of conflicts in Sudan =

Location of Sudan (red)

== Ancient Times ==
=== Nubia ===
- circa 3,050 B.C.E. Hor-Aha, the second pharaoh of Egypt, led a campaign against the Nubians

=== Kingdom of Kerma ===
- circa 1,506 B.C.E. — 1,493 B.C.E. During the reign of Thutmose I, the Kingdom of Kerma rebelled against Egyptian rule and Thutmose I traveled up the Nile and fought in the battle, personally killing the Nubian king

=== Egyptian Empire ===
The Egyptian Empire at its maximum territorial extent in the 15th century BC.

- circa 1,282 B.C.E. Seti's military campaigns
- circa 1,279 B.C.E. — 1,213 B.C.E. Ramesses II's campaigns in Nubia

=== Kingdom of Kush ===
- 23 B.C.E. The Roman prefect of Egypt invaded the Kingdom of Kush after an initial attack by the queen of Meröe, razing Napata to the ground
- circa 300 C.E. Ezana of Axum launched several military campaigns, destroying the Kingdom of Kush

== Medieval Times ==
=== Kingdom of Makuria ===
- 1312 C.E. Mamluk invasion

== Modern Times ==
=== Sultanate of Darfur ===
- 1722 C.E. — 1786 C.E. Civil War

=== Egypt Eyalet ===
The Eyalet of Egypt in 1833.

- February 1820 C.E. — October 1822 C.E. Invasion of Libya and Sudan

=== Khedivate of Egypt ===
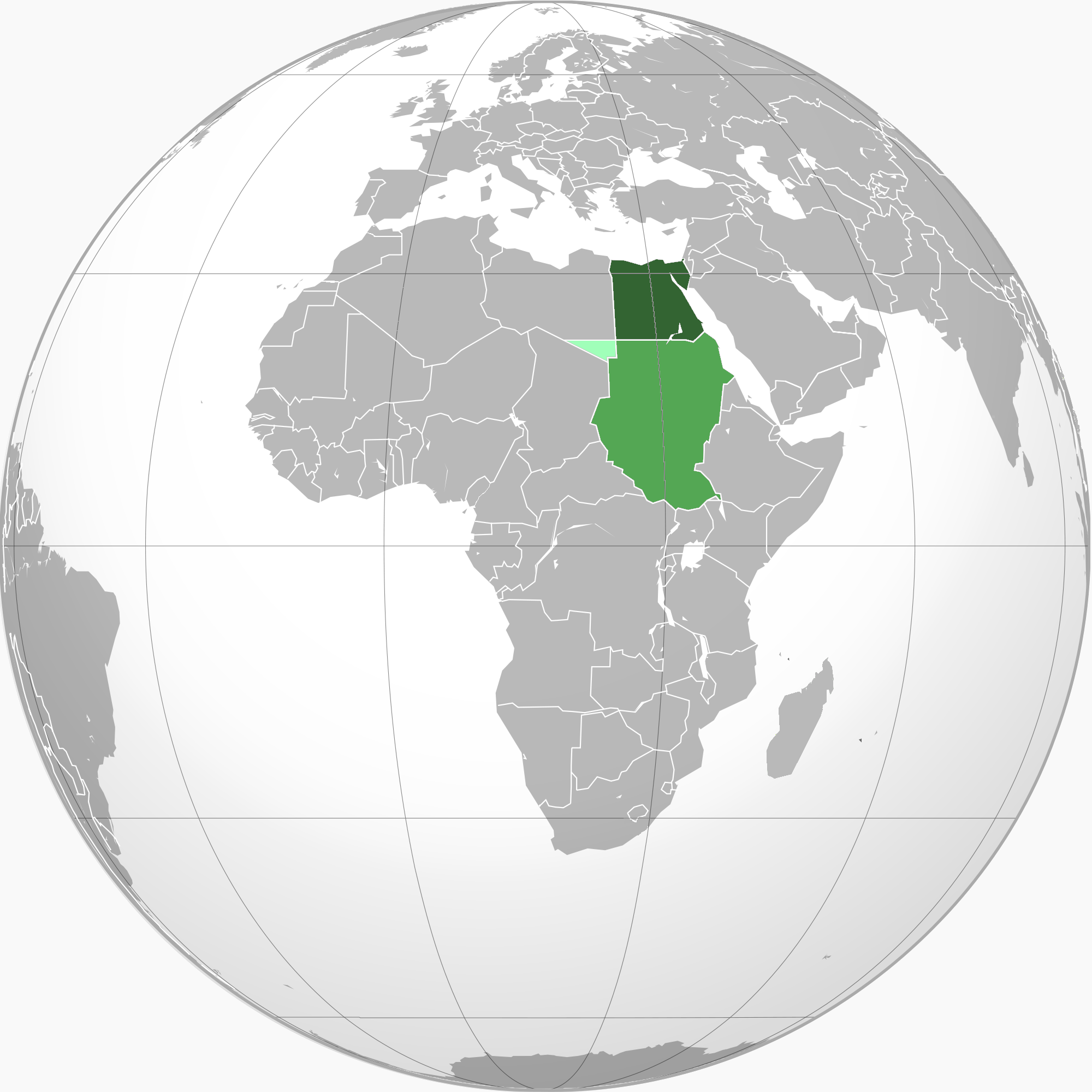
Khedivate of Egypt

- 1899 — 1901 Rabih War
  - 1874 Rabih az-Zubayr conquered the Sultanate of Darfur
- 1881 C.E. — 1899 C.E. The Mahdist War
  - November 3, 1883 C.E. — November 5, 1883 C.E. Battle of El Obeid
  - February 4, 1884 C.E. — February 29, 1884 C.E. First and Second Battles of El Teb
  - March 13, 1884 C.E. Battle of Tamai
  - March 13, 1884 C.E. — January 26, 1885 C.E. Siege of Khartoum
  - January 17, 1885 C.E. Battle of Abu Klea
  - March 22, 1885 C.E. Battle of Tofrek
  - February 10, 1885 C.E. Battle of Kirbekan
  - December 30, 1885 C.E. Battle of Ginnis
  - December 20, 1888 C.E. Battle of Suakin
  - March 9, 1889 C.E. — March 10, 1889 C.E. Battle of Gallabat
  - July 17, 1894 C.E. Battle of Kassala
  - June 7, 1896 C.E. Battle of Ferkeh
  - April 8, 1898 C.E. Battle of Atbara
  - September 2, 1898 C.E. Battle of Omdurman
  - November 25, 1899 C.E. Battle of Umm Diwaykarat

=== Anglo-Egyptian Sudan ===
- July 28, 1914 C.E. — November 11, 1918 C.E. World War I
  - October 29, 1914 C.E. — October 30, 1918 C.E. Middle Eastern theatre
    - 1,914 C.E. — 1918 C.E. North African theatre
      - November 19, 1915 C.E. — February 1917 C.E. Senussi Campaign
- September 1, 1939 C.E. — September 2, 1945 C.E. World War II
  - June 10, 1940 C.E. — May 2, 1945 C.E. Mediterranean and Middle East theatre
    - June 10, 1940 C.E. — November 27, 1941 C.E. East African Campaign
      - August 3, 1940 C.E. — August 19, 1940 C.E. Italian conquest of British Somaliland
      - February 5, 1941 C.E. — April 1, 1941 C.E. Battle of Keren
      - May 4, 1941 C.E. — May 19, 1941 C.E. Battle of Amba Alagi
      - November 13, 1941 C.E. — November 27, 1941 C.E. Battle of Gondar

=== Republic of the Sudan ===
- August 18, 1955 C.E. — March 27, 1972 C.E. First Sudanese Civil War
  - 1969 C.E. — 1972 C.E. Anyanya rebellion

=== Democratic Republic of the Sudan ===
- April 1, 1983 C.E. — January 2005 C.E. Second Sudanese Civil War

=== Republic of the Sudan ===
- 1987 C.E. — July 9, 2011 C.E. Lord's Resistance Army insurgency
- 2003 C.E. — August 31, 2020 C.E. War in Darfur
  - May 10, 2008 C.E. — May 12, 2,008 C.E. Attack on Omdurman and Khartoum
- December 18, 2005 C.E. — January 15, 2010 C.E. Chad-Sudan conflict
- November 27, 2006 C.E. — November 29, 2006 C.E. Battle of Malakal
- January 2009 C.E. — ongoing Sudanese nomadic conflicts
  - April 23, 2010 C.E. South Darfur clash
- January 7, 2011 C.E. — ongoing South Sudan internal conflict
- May 19, 2011 — 2020 Sudan–SRF conflict
- March 26, 2012 C.E. — September 26, 2012 C.E. Sudan–South Sudan Border War
  - March 26, 2012 C.E. — March 28, 2012 C.E. First Battle of Heglig
  - April 17, 2012 C.E. — April 18, 2012 C.E. Abyei border clash
- April 15, 2023 C.E. — ongoing 2023 Sudan conflict

== See also ==
- Sudanese Armed Forces
- Sudanese Air Force
- The fighting forces of Egypt and Nubia
- Sudanic fighting forces versus Persian, Roman and Islamic forces
- Military history of Africa
- African military systems to 1,800 C.E.
- African military systems 1,800 C.E. — 1,900 C.E.
- African military systems after 1,900 C.E.
