= Bentiu Civil Hospital =

Hospital in South Sudan

Geography
- Location: Bentiu (Rubkona County), Unity State, South Sudan

Organisation
- Type: Government hospital

Services
- Beds: 120

Bentiu Civil Hospital, often known as Bentiu Hospital and sometimes Bentiu State Hospital or Bentiu District Hospital is a government hospital in Bentiu, Unity State, South Sudan.

== Description ==
Bentiu Hospital is a 120-bed government-operated hospital in Bentiu.

== History ==
The hospital was constructed by a petrochemical company that donated it to the Government of South Sudan.

In 2014, during the South Sudanese Civil War, the hospital was the scene of violence when Nuer civilians were killed after refusing to join other Nuer who were supporting rebels. The hospital saw a rise in malaria cases in 2017 and in 2021.

The hospital has been supported buy the Kuwait Red Crescent, which donated medications in 2022. The United Nations Mission in South Sudan has also supported the hospital through a training program.

== See also ==
- List of hospitals in South Sudan
- Health in South Sudan
