= Air campaign of the Heglig Crisis =

Sudanese military air campaign

- Part of the Heglig Crisis
- Prominent locations targeted during the Air Campaign.
Date	1 March 2012 – September 2012
Location	South Sudan
Result	Sudanese operational success

Belligerents
Sudan	South Sudan

Commanders and leaders
(Sudan) Omar al-Bashir	(South Sudan) Salva Kiir

Strength
10 helicopters	63 combat airplanes 29 helicopters

Casualties and losses
Unknown	17 killed 32 wounded

The air campaign of the Heglig Crisis was a military air campaign of the Sudanese Government against the Republic of South Sudan during the Heglig Crisis.

== Conflict ==
The campaign started on 1 March 2012, in Panykang County when two Sudanese planes damaged two oil wells in South Sudan.

Date	Location	Casualties	Notes	Citation
1 March	Panykang County, Unity State	None	Two oil wells damaged	
March	Unity oilfield	Unknown	—	
30 March	Various	Unknown	On the positions of SPLA forces along the border.	
4 April	Unity State	None	1 MiG-29 lost	
9 April	Teshwin, Unity State	None	—	
12 April	Bentiu, Unity State	1 soldier killed and 4 civilians wounded	—	
14 April	Heglig, South Kordofan	Unknown	—	
14 April	Bentiu, Unity State	1 soldier and 4 civilians killed, 6 wounded	Rubkotna bridge undamaged.	
14 April	Abiemnom County of Dinka Ruweng Community, Unity State	36 people were injured during an air attack in Ruweng Biemnom County	Ruweng Biemnom bridge was destroyed	
15 April	Heglig, South Kordofan	Unknown	Possible damage to oil facilities	
15 April	UN peacekeepers' camp in South Sudan	None	Confirmed by Kouider Zerrouk spokesman for UNMISS.	
15 April	Mayom County, Unity State	7 people killed and 14 wounded	—	
16 April	Villages East of Bentiu, Unity State	2 people killed and 8 wounded	—	
22 April	Unity oil field	—	—	
23 April	Bentiu – Rubkona area	3 people killed	Market in Rubkona damaged	
21 May	Werguet, Northern Bahr el Ghazal	—	—	
22 May	Werguet, Northern Bahr el Ghazal	—	—	
28 May	Werguet, Northern Bahr el Ghazal	10 killed	—	

Note: Since Sudan does not allow journalists into conflict areas, reports of the bombings and the conflict are by-and-large reported by sources in South Sudan or those allied with the Sudan People's Liberation Army. Sudan claims that it has exclusively bombed South Sudanese military positions and denies all further allegations.
