= Agok skirmish =

2012 Agok border skirmish
- Part of the Heglig Crisis and Sudan-South Sudan relations
Date	17 April 2012
Location	South Kordofan, Sudan; Northern Bahr el Ghazal, South Sudan 10.1464941°N 27.6891518°E
Result	Indecisive

Belligerents
South Sudan: South Sudan People's Liberation Army	Sudan: Sudanese Armed Forces

Commanders and leaders
Salva Kiir	Omar al-Bashir

Casualties and losses
7 killed	15 killed
- Total: 22 killed
- Location within Sudan.

The Agok Skirmish was an armed confrontation between South Sudanese and Sudanese soldiers during the Heglig Crisis. The incident raised tensions of the possibility of an all-out war between South Sudan and Sudan.

== Events ==
On the night of April 17, 2012, a South Sudanese soldier positioned along the disputed borderline, crossed onto the Sudanese side to get water from a river. He was shot dead by a Sudanese soldier. The shooting sparked subsequent clashes between South Sudanese SPLA and Sudanese SAF troops in the area. The fighting lasted for hours, killing 22 soldiers.

A Sudanese spokesman claimed the action was intended to create another battle front in the war to distract Sudanese military forces in the region. A South Sudanese government spokesmen labeled the fight as a "misunderstanding" and said he did not think violence would continue there.

This incident briefly raised tensions between South Sudan and Sudan that the border conflict centered around the Heglig oil fields, has the potential to spillover over elsewhere along the disputed border.
