= Nhialdiu =

- Location in South Sudan
- Coordinates: 9.023144°N 29.679179°E
- Country: South Sudan
- Region: Greater Upper Nile
- State: Unity State
- County: Rubkona County

Population (2006 Estimate)
  - Total: 7,700
- Time zone: UTC+2 (CAT)

Nhialdiu (or Nhial Diu) is a large village in the Rubkona County of Unity State, in the Greater Upper Nile region of South Sudan. It is located about 40 kilometres (25 mi) southwest of Bentiu.

Nhialdiu is in Leek Nuer country.

== Civil war ==
The village is at a strategic junction of dirt roads. Between June 1997 and November 1998 fighting between factions in the Nhialdiu area caused about 70% of the population to flee to Bentiu and Mankien. In early 1998 villages around Nhialdiu were looted and destroyed. The health center in Nhialdiu was destroyed. Between July and August 2000 during fighting between militias a large band of country between Nimne and Nhialdiu was depopulated and burned to the ground. Many attacks were reported on villages around Nhialdiu in January–April 2002.

A study of Landsat data between 1999 and 2004 showed major shifts in land use that closely corresponded to reports of fighting in Block 5A. Between 1999 and 2002 most farming activity stopped in the bands that extended 10 kilometres (6.2 mi) on each side of the newly built oil roads. Traditional farming areas were abandoned and there was a gradual drift of farming activity towards the south and west. By 2002 there was no sign of any farming activity around Nhialdiu, where a series of village attacks were reported for the last three years.

== Post war ==
Sporadic security problems continued after the end of the civil war in January 2005. On 23 March 2005 Leek Nuer raiders attacked cattle camps around Nhialdiu killing twenty people and taking 24,000 head of cattle. 6,000-10,000 civilians took refuge in Nhialdiu. The Bul launched a counterattack on the Leek, causing more civilians to flee to Nhialdiu, Bentiu and Rubkona. In January 2007 the vice-president of the Government of South Sudan visited the village. That week there was small-scale spear fighting in Pakcur and Nhialdiu in which five people were wounded in revenge for a killing that had taken place three months before. In August 2011 a public bus with 12 passengers hit landmines when travelling from Bentiu to Nhialdiu. Two people died and six were injured. The government suspected that a militia linked to Gai Yoach had planted the mines.

As of January 2010 the Primary Health Care Center at Nhialdiu was partially equipped, and was being staffed by qualified nurses. The center was short of supplies of vaccines and medicines.

== Sources ==
- Achouri, Radhia (20 April 2005). "Press Briefing by Radhia Achouri, Spokesperson for the UN Mission in the Sudan". UN News. Archived from the original on 2012-11-04.
- "Block 5A - Oil Field of Sudan - MASSIVE CHANGES IN TRADITIONAL LAND USE SINCE THE INTRODUCTION OF OIL INDUSTRY". Prinz Engineering. Archived from the original on 2012-04-02.
- Kuich, Bonifacio Taban (August 23, 2011). "Landmines kill 5 and injure 21 in South Sudan's Unity state". Archived from the original on 2011-09-19.*"OCHA Situation Report Southern Sudan 1 - 7 January 2007". UN Office for the Coordination of Humanitarian Affairs. January 7, 2007.
- "Quarterly Progress Report QPR (2010)-(04)". CARE SOUTH SUDAN. 2011-01-15. Archived from the original on 2012-03-28.
- Rone, Jemera (2003). Sudan, oil, and human rights. Human Rights Watch. ISBN 1-56432-291-2.
- "Sudan Bulletin No. 74: 06 - 13 Feb 1999". World Food Programme. 25 Feb 1999.
- "War-related Human Rights Abuses by Government of Sudan (GoS) Upper Nile January to April 2002". SUDAN FOCAL POINT- AFRICA. 2 April 2002. Archived from the original on 2012-03-25.
