= James Gatduel Gatluak =

James Gatduel Gatluak is a South Sudanese military officer, and commander of the 4th division of the Sudan People's Liberation Army (SPLA). He led the 4th division against forces from Sudan during the 2012 South Sudan-Sudan border conflict in the Battle of Heglig. At the time of the incident, he held the rank of general.
