= Malakal Teaching Hospital =

Hospital in South Sudan

Geography
- Location: Malakal, Upper Nile State, South Sudan

Organisation
- Type: Government hospital

Malakal Teaching Hospital is the main hospital in South Sudan's second largest city Malakal.

It was the scene of a massacre in 2014, before partially reopening in 2017. The hospital was suffering from a shortage of staff in 2021 and 2022.

== History ==
Dak Fadiet, the father of Reth Kwongo died in the hospital on May 8, 1951.

In 2014, during the South Sudanese Civil War 3,000 civilians took shelter in the hospital. After the Nuer White Army attacked, Dinka and Shilluk civilians were killed, medical equipment was looted, and the hospital was damaged. Médecins Sans Frontières reported the partial reopening of the hospital in March 2017. Hospitals health services have also been supported by the International Committee of the Red Cross and UNICEF.

In 2021, leadership and staff, including then director general Ayuel Isaac Abiel complained of understaffing, reporting that the hospital had only three doctors. In 2022, the hospital remained short staffed and only the maternity and the outpatient department were functional. The director general of the hospital in 2022 was Nyango John Adwok.

== See also ==
- List of hospitals in South Sudan
- Health in South Sudan
