= Aweil Civil Hospital =

Hospital in South Sudan

Geography
- Location: Aweil (Aweil Center County)

Organisation
- Type: Government hospital

History
- Opened: 1964

Aweil Civil Hospital is a government hospital in Aweil, South Sudan that opened in 1964.

== Description ==
Aweil Civil Hospital is a government hospital in Aweil located near the A43 road in the Bahr el Ghazal region of South Sudan.

Hospital services include a neonatal ward and nutrition. Maternity and pediatrics departments are by Médecins Sans Frontières.

== History ==
Aweil Civil Hospital was built in 1964.

In 2010, President Salva Kiir promised to assess conditions at the hospital. The hospital saw an influx of patients with Heptatitis B in 2012. The hospital's first South-Sudanese surgeon started in 2018

Financial support from the United Kingdom's administrated Health Pooled Fund ended April 2022, while Canadian, American, Swedish and European Funding continued.

== See also ==
- List of hospitals in South Sudan
- Health in South Sudan
