= First Battle of Heglig =

2012 border conflict between military forces of Sudan and South Sudan

- Part of the Heglig Crisis
Date	26–28 March 2012
Location	Heglig, Sudan 9.999444°N 29.398611°E
Result	South Sudanese victory

Belligerents
South Sudan	Sudan

Commanders and leaders
(South Sudan) Salva Kiir	(Sudan) Omar al-Bashir

Strength
Unknown	1,000 soldiers

Casualties and losses
3	Unknown
- Heglig within Sudan.

The First Battle of Heglig was a military campaign of South Sudan that gave rise to the Heglig Crisis.

== Conflict ==
On March 26, the Republic of Sudan claimed that South Sudan attacked the Heglig oilfield, located in the Sudanese state of South Kordofan, while South Sudan claimed that it was acting in self-defence after an attack on its territory.

The Republic of Sudan's Information Minister, Abdallah Ali Masar, confirmed that South Sudan had penetrated 10 km into Sudanese territory, but also claimed that Sudanese forces had repelled them and driven them back, and had taken several prisoners.

South Sudanese troops were ordered by their government to disengage and withdraw from the disputed area on 28 March. Dead bodies and destroyed vehicles lay strewn in Heglig, the oilfield where the bloody battles took place. Three bodies were identified as South Sudanese soldiers, while a tank as well as 4 pickup trucks were destroyed.
