= Juba Teaching Hospital =

South Sudanese hospital

Geography
- Location: Unity Avenue, Juba, South Sudan
- Coordinates: 4.850082°N 31.608532°E

Organisation
- Type: Teaching hospital
- Affiliated university: University of Juba

Services
- Beds: 512

History
- Opened: 1975

Juba Teaching Hospital is a government-run 512-bed teaching hospital in Juba, South Sudan. The hospital functions as the ultimate referral hospital for the nation.

== Services ==
The hospital provides secondary level care for Central Equatoria state and functions as the ultimate referral hospital for the entire nation, serving the needs of 8.26 million people in 2020. Services include primary care, an emergency department, obstetrics and gynaecology, neonatal intensive care, surgery, and vaccinations. The maternity ward has thirteen beds.

== History ==
The teaching hospital was opened by the Government of Sudan in 1975 and is affiliated with the University of Juba.

The International Committee of the Red Cross (ICRC) provided the hospital with a laboratory and X-ray facilities in 1993. As of 2006, ICRC support continued and the hospital employed 400 nursing staff, including 230 students. From 2006 to 2008 the hospital underwent renovations by the China Overseas Engineering Group. During 2016, the hospital ran out of medicine, had no electrical supply and was barely functioning.

The hospital opened an 2,500-litres-per-day oxygen plant in 2021 With support from the Government of China, services expanded in 2021 to include an infectious disease department and increased intensive care capacity. The Israeli government added support to the Intensive Care Unit in 2022.

The hospital is considered to be the best in the nation.

== See also ==
- List of hospitals in South Sudan
- Health in South Sudan
