= Rubkona County =

- County
- Location in South Sudan
- Coordinates: 9.293485°N 29.789198°E
- Country: South Sudan
- Region: Greater Upper Nile
- State: Unity State

Area
  - Total: 1,378 sq mi (3,569 km^{2})
- Elevation: 1,300 ft (400 m)

Population (2017 estimate)
  - Total: 149,679
  - Density: 108.6/sq mi (41.94/km^{2})
- Time zone: UTC+2 (CAT)

Rubkona County is an administrative division of Unity State, South Sudan.

The administrative center is the town of Rubkona, across the Bahr el Ghazal River from the state capital Bentiu and the town of Yoynyang, which are also in Rubkona County. Large villages in the county include Dhorbor, Nhialdiu, Biel, and Rot Riak (Unity) where oilfields are based.

Rubkona County has a sub tropical climate, with a rainy season from May to September and a dry season from October to April. The region is swampy, flooding in the rainy season. Malaria, Kala Azar and Bilharzia are endemic. Most of the population are Nuer people, agropastoralists for whom cattle are the measure of wealth and prestige. The county lies on the migration route of Baggara tribes, which is an ongoing cause of tension.

During the Second Sudanese Civil War (1983-2005) some of the rural population fled to the towns of Rubkona and Bentiu. Others moved north to Khartoum or escaped to bordering countries. As of 2008, three years after the peace agreement had been signed, refugees were still returning. In 2008 the Action Contre le Faim (ACF) non-government organization was running a treatment center in Bentiu for sufferers from Severe Acute Malnutrition with medical complications. ACF was also running two distribution sites in Rubkona and Bentiu to treat Severe Acute Malnutrition without medical complications.
