= South Sudan–Sudan relations =

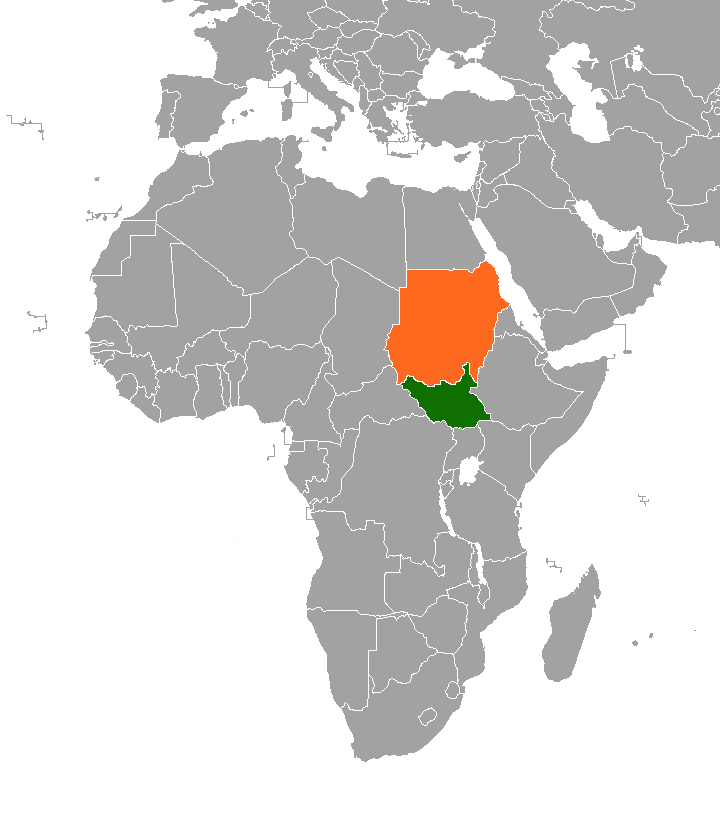

- South Sudan: Sudan

Diplomatic mission
- South Sudan Embassy, Juba: Sudan Embassy, Khartoum

South Sudan and Sudan officially established relations on 9 July 2011, following South Sudan's independence. Sudan became the first country in the world to recognize the independence of South Sudan. However, relations between South Sudan and Sudan have remained poor, with both sides supporting rebel groups in each other's territories.

The length of the international border between the two countries is 2,158 km.

== History ==
=== Independence of South Sudan ===
Sudan became the first state in the world to recognise South Sudan as a sovereign state and said it intended to open an embassy in the South Sudanese capital of Juba. On the occasion of South Sudan's independence, Sudanese President Omar al-Bashir spoke to the delegation present for independence celebrations, saying that he "congratulate[s] our brothers and sisters in South Sudan on the occasion of the declaration of their new state and the creation of the State of South Sudan in this dear part of our homeland."

== Bilateral relations ==
A brief war erupted in 2012 over the border town of Heglig, home to the Heglig oilfields. Following a six-month conflict, which saw South Sudan briefly enter the area before being pushed back by Sudan, an agreement over the border and mineral sharing was signed.

During the Sudanese civil war (2023–present), South Sudan adopted a mediatory role between the Rapid Support Forces (RSF) and the Sudanese Armed Forces (SAF). In February 2025, tensions escalated when the RSF allied with the SPLM–N, a rebel group near the South Sudanese border. In December 2025, the RSF, SAF, and South Sudan People's Defence Forces signed a tripartite agreement to prevent the conflict from damaging the Heglig oil fields due to the strategic role it plays in Sudan and South Sudan. The South Sudan People's Defence Forces entered the area to maintain security as a neutral party.

== Ongoing disputes ==
=== Abyei ===
Abyei is administered by Sudan, but also claimed by South Sudan. Abyei was supposed to have a referendum to determine which country it would be part of, but has been delayed pending discussion of disputes.

=== Kafia Kingi ===
Kafia Kingi is a South Sudan sovereign territory according to the authoritative 2005 Comprehensive Peace Agreement signed by both states, the UN, and Colin Powell representing the US, but has largely been controlled ever since then by Sudanese forces. The binding 2005 agreement specifies use of the 1 January 1956 boundary. Kafia Kingi was not transferred to Darfur in the north until 1960.

=== Heglig Oilfield ===
The town of Heglig, which is internationally recognised as Sudanese territory but which is also claimed by South Sudan.

=== Oil transit ===
South Sudan ceased producing oil on a complaint that Sudan was "stealing" its oil en route via pipeline to Port Sudan, the only accessible venue to sell South Sudanese oil beyond Sudan. Sudan responded, saying that it was a "fee" for using the pipeline that was owned by Sudan. Several oil trucks were also briefly held by Sudan but later released saying it was a good faith initiative to lessen tensions.

In September 2012, Sudan and South Sudan agreed a deal on border security and oil production to permit oil exports from South Sudan through Sudan to continue. In May 2013, Sudanese President Omar al-Bashir threatened again to block oil transits via Sudan if South Sudan continued to support insurgents in South Kordofan and Darfur.

== Cultural relations ==
Prior to independence there were also numerous Southern Sudanese, mostly blue collar, workers in the north. At the time of the referendum there was a split on the issue of partitioning the country amid Sudan's claim that they would have to return or apply for work permits.

Economic relations include the transfer of South Sudanese oil via Sudanese pipelines to the Red Sea for export.

== Bilateral visits ==
The Sudanese President Omar al-Bashir made his first visit to the south on 12 April 2013 since independence.

== See also ==
- War in Darfur
