= Bentiu Airport =

- IATA: n/a; ICAO: HSBT

Summary
- Airport type: Public, Civilian
- Owner: Civil Aviation Authority of South Sudan
- Serves: Bentiu, South Sudan
- Location: Rubkona, South Sudan
- Elevation AMSL: 1,279 ft / 390 m
- Coordinates: 09°18′13″N 029°47′14″E

Map
- Location of Bentiu Airport in South Sudan

Runways
| Direction | Length | | Surface |
| Direction | ft | m | Surface |
|---|---|---|---|
| 17/35 | 4,264 | 1,300 | Unpaved |

Bentiu Airport is an airport in South Sudan. It is located just north of Rubkona, a town that sits across the Bahr el Ghazal River from Bentiu. Via El Salaam Bridge, the airport is 4 kilometres (2.5 mi) by road from Bentiu.

== Location ==
Bentiu Airport (IATA: n/a, ICAO: HSBT) is located in Rubkon County in Northern Liech, just north of the town of Rubkona, near the International border with the Republic of Sudan. The airport is located about 4 kilometres (2.5 mi) directly north of Bentiu.

This location lies approximately 530 kilometres (330 mi), by air, northwest of Juba International Airport, the largest airport in South Sudan. The geographic coordinates of this airport are: 9° 18' 12.60"N, 29° 47' 13.92"E (Latitude: 9.30350; Longitude: 29.78720). Bentiu Airport sits at an elevation of 390 metres (1,280 ft) above sea level. The airport has a single unpaved runway, the dimensions of which are 1300 x 23 metres, or 4264 x 75 feet.

== Overview ==
Bentiu Airport is a small civilian and military airport that serves the town of Bentiu and surrounding communities.

== See also ==
- List of airports in South Sudan
