= List of hospitals in South Sudan =

The following is a list of currently operating hospitals in South Sudan.

Selected Hospitals in South Sudan
Name	Type	Location	Opened	Coordinates	Ref
Doctors 360 Thongping Clinic	Private	Juba			
AMI South Sudan Clinic	Private	Juba			
Gurei Medical Center	Private	Juba	2023		
Prime Hospital	Private	Juba			
Aweil Civil Hospital	Government	Aweil	1964	9.036°N 27.362°E	
Bentiu Civil Hospital	Government	Bentiu		9.2542°N 29.8033°E	
Juba Teaching Hospital	Government Teaching Hospital	Juba	1975	4.850082°N 31.608532°E	
Malakal Teaching Hospital	Government Teaching Hospital	Malakal		9.555°N 31.6484°E	
Wau Teaching Hospital	Government Teaching Hospital	Wau		7.70111°N 27.98972°E	
Rumbek State Hospital	Government	Rumbek		6.80619°N 29.67742°E	
Kirmayardit Women's Hospital	Government	Rumbek		6.80619°N 29.67742°E	
Yambio State Hospital	Government	Yambio		4.57083°N 28.39417°E	
Torit General Hospital	Government	Torit		4.40806°N 32.57500°E	
Bor State Hospital	Government	Bor		6.2059°N 31.5563°E	
Yei Civil Hospital	Government	Yei		4.09444°N 30.67639°E	
Warrap State Hospital	Government	Kuajok		8.30278°N 27.98000°E	
Renk State Hospital	Government	Renk		11.8300°N 32.8000°E	
Nimule General Hospital	Government	Nimule		3.59611°N 32.06361°E	
Maridi District Hospital	Government	Maridi		4.91667°N 29.46944°E	
