= Abortion in Sudan =

In Sudan, abortion is illegal except in cases of risk to life or pregnancy from rape. Legal abortions in the case of rape must be performed within 90 days of pregnancy and require police reports. Providers of illegal abortion are often imprisoned. Abortions are required to be performed by doctors, which limits access in areas with fewer doctors, while difficult requirements limit abortions in cases of rape. Most abortions in the country are illegal and unsafe. Illegal abortions are often performed by midwives or self-induced using traditional methods or abortion pills acquired on the black market. The country's high rate of unintended pregnancy and low rate of birth control contribute to abortions. Some women with extramarital pregnancies are encouraged by their families to have abortions. Post-abortion care is legally performed by doctors, but may be limited by documentation requirements and the threat of legal reports, which some providers intentionally avoid. The abortion debate does not commonly feature in public discourse in Sudan.

Sudan inherited the United Kingdom's abortion law in 1899, prohibiting abortions unless they were life-saving. This law existed until the Islamist government of Sudan enacted a new penal code under the Criminal Act 1991. This penal code was based on the Maliki school of Islamic law, with an emphasis on the Islamic law on prohibited sexual relations. The government participated in anti-abortion lobbying and boycotted the 1994 International Conference on Population and Development over its stance on abortion. Starting in 2010, the government addressed abortion prevention and post-abortion care amid goals to decrease maternal mortality. The Sudanese civil war (2023–present) involved wartime rape, which contributed to abortions.

== Legislation ==
Article 135 of the 1991 penal code of Sudan prohibits abortions, with exceptions for the grounds of risk to life and pregnancy from rape. There is also an exception if the fetus is already dead. Abortions in the case of rape must be performed up to a gestational age of 90 days, while there is no limit in the case of risk to life. Proving the case of rape requires a police report and the completion of Form 8 to submit to the provider. Legal abortions must be performed by a senior doctor. An illegal abortion is punishable by a fine or a prison sentence of up to one year. Women are not commonly prosecuted for receiving abortions, whereas they are often prosecuted for illegal pregnancy. Providers of illegal abortion are often arrested.

== History ==
In 1899, the Anglo-Egyptian Sudan inherited a British abortion law, which had been adapted from a 1860 law implemented in British India. This criminalized abortion except in cases of "good faith for the purpose of saving the life of the woman". Illegal abortions were punishable by a fine and a prison sentence, which was up to three years if the procedure was done before quickening (Note: The law did not define when quickening occurred, but it was accepted to mean the first discernible movements of the fetus, or approximately four to five months of pregnancy.) or up to seven years if done after. This law existed until 1991.

The Islamist government of Sudan, which took power in 1989, opposed sexual and reproductive rights and implemented a conservative interpretation of Islamic law. The penal code implemented by the Criminal Act 1991 prohibited abortion except in cases of risk to life and rape. Prison sentences of three years were enforced for illegal abortions, increased to five years if the procedure occurred after the ensoulment of the fetus, which Sudanese law defined as 90 days after conception. The law also entitles the family of the fetus to receive compensation from the abortion provider. The penal code was based on the Maliki school of Islamic jurisprudence, which prohibited non-marital pregnancy as an example of zina (unlawful sexual intercourse), a crime that the government emphasized. This government considered abortion a violation of Islamic law, believing that, as married women were obliged to have children, only women committing zina would seek abortion.

The Islamist government did not ratify the Maputo Protocol, which provides for a right to abortion, or the Convention on the Elimination of All Forms of Discrimination Against Women. It also boycotted the 1994 International Conference on Population and Development, viewing its support of abortion and family planning as violations of Islamic law, alongside the Islamist governments of Saudi Arabia and Lebanon. The government discouraged Sudanese organizations from participating in the conference and called for the closure of the country's United Nations Population Fund (UNFPA) branch. Sudanese representatives also participated in an anti-abortion lobbying coalition at the United Nations; American activist Austin Ruse said in 2002, "We have realized that without countries like Sudan, abortion would have been recognized as a universal human right in a UN document." The 2006 Voluntary and Humanitarian Work Act placed restrictions on nongovernmental organizations in the country, enabling the government to limit abortion advocacy.

The Islamist government aimed to decrease the country's maternal mortality rate, but policies about the subject did not address unsafe abortion. The government first addressed abortion prevention and post-abortion care in the 2010 Reproductive Health Policy. The 2015 Roadmap for Reducing Maternal and Newborn Death and Mortality in Sudan noted that unsafe abortion contributed to maternal mortality and allowed the use of misoprostol in mid-level health facilities, though this was not implemented, as many providers believed midwives would use it for illegal abortion. In Sudan in the 2010s, the abortion debate was not a topic of advocacy by women's rights groups or healthcare workers, and conservatives widely opposed legal abortion, believing it would encourage non-marital pregnancies. Anti-abortion views from the government and the widely conservative public contributed to a lack of pro-abortion movements. Many women's rights activists also opposed abortion, with support being more common among younger activists whose discussion was limited to social media.

A December 2022 workshop led by the Sima Centre for Training and Protection of Women and Children's Rights, with the involvement of the Ministry of Health and Ministry of Justice, proposed an amendment to the abortion law to remove restrictions on applying for legal abortion on the grounds of rape, such as Form 8. Wartime sexual violence during the Sudanese civil war, which began in 2023, contributed to requests for abortions. Legal barriers often prevented abortions, and abortion pills were not widely available due to the law. In 2024, the acting Attorney General of Sudan, Al-Fatih Tayfour, created directives on responding to wartime sexual violence, which included the provision of legal abortion.

== Prevalence ==
Sudan has a high rate of unintended pregnancy and a low rate of birth control use, leading to abortions. The illegality and stigmatization of abortion cause women with unintended pregnancies to seek illegal abortions, which are mostly unsafe. Most women keep abortions secret from their families. As of 2019, there is no national data on the prevalence of unsafe abortion, though one estimate said that, between 1995 and 2000, the country had 702,248 abortions, of which 1,893 resulted in death. Unsafe abortion caused 4.66% of maternal mortality in the country in the period 2009–2019.

Legal abortions are rare and are typically only performed on life-threatening pregnancies, being difficult to acquire in the case of rape. The requirement that abortions be performed by senior doctors limits access, as there are few doctors in rural areas (where most of the population lives) and conflict zones. Abortion providers are sometimes targets of harassment or violence. Some women seek unsafe abortions as they are unaware they can receive legal abortions, and rape victims often perform abortions due to a lack of access to emergency contraception.

Traditional abortion methods involve the insertion of objects in the uterus or the consumption of herbal products, poisons, or drugs. Traditional midwives in some rural areas perform abortions involving the insertion of herbal medicine into the uterus, often resulting in complications. Self-induced abortions often involve vaginal douching or consumption of ginger, parsley, or cinnamon. Safe abortion methods such as misoprostol are available on the black market, which many women cannot afford. Many midwives in Khartoum illegally provide abortions; women who opt for their services view them as more confidential and less likely to cause legal issues than hospitals. Extramarital pregnancy is stigmatized and is seen as dishonorable for both the mother and her family, so some women receive abortions with the help of family members.

Public debate about abortion is rare. Abortion is a taboo subject in the country, with many people considering it to be killing babies. Medical professionals prosecuted for illegal abortions often receive media attention. These include the case in which a doctor was arrested after a court ruled that he had performed unauthorized abortions on unmarried women and a case in which police arrested a group of prostitutes, one of whom revealed an illegal abortion clinic.

== Post-abortion care ==
Post-abortion care (PAC) is only legal if performed by a physician. Most medical schools in the country do not have PAC training due to a common conservative view that increasing PAC access would promote abortion. PAC training by UNFPA and DKT International was authorized by the Islamist government. Training in manual vacuum aspiration (MVA) began in 2007. Misoprostol is only legally available at maternity hospitals with a senior obstetrician/gynecologist's prescription.

A 2009 study in Reproductive Health Matters found that 96.7% of abortion services in Khartoum were PAC. A 2021 study in Port Sudan found that PAC comprised 11.3% of gynecological hospital treatments, of which 40% were for induced abortion. The 2009 Khartoum study found that hospitals mainly used the non-recommendeddilation and curettage method, while the latter found that most PAC treatments used MVA, followed by misoprostol.

Healthcare facilities require victims of violent crimes, such as abortion, to complete Form 8, documenting their injuries, before receiving treatment, as required by the 1991 Criminal Procedure Act, despite a 2016 decree of the Ministry of Justice waiving this requirement in critical cases. Another barrier to PAC is that public hospitals are often guarded by police, who may suspect maternity ward patients of illegal pregnancy. PAC patients may be reported to the police by healthcare workers who oppose abortion. The country's 2013 medical ethical guidelines do not require providers to report illegal abortions unless they are fatal, and some PAC providers, including those who personally oppose abortion, view the Hippocratic oath as obliging them not to report patients. Such providers may record abortions as miscarriages to avoid police reports and Form 8, or they may report that patients are married to avoid police suspicion.

== See also ==
- Abortion in Africa
- Health in Sudan
- Human rights in Sudan
- Marriage in Sudan
