= Second Battle of Heglig =

- Part of the Heglig Crisis
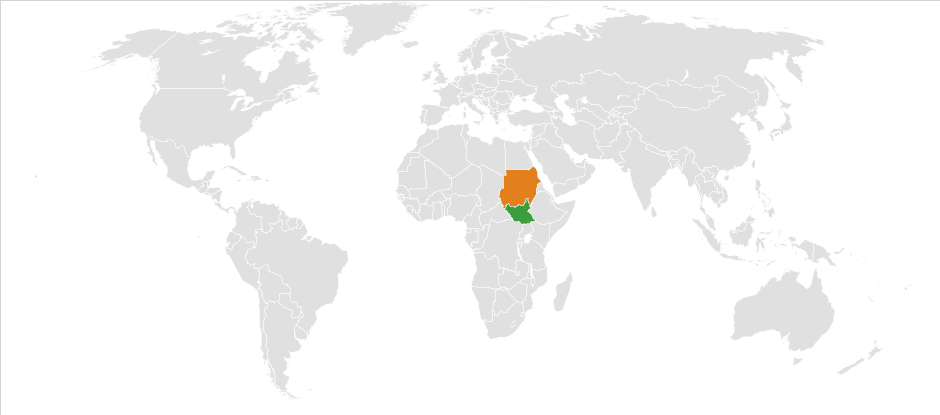
- A map showing South Sudan and Sudan
Date	10–20 April 2012
Location	Heglig, Sudan 9.999444°N 29.398611°E
Result	Sudanese Victory
Territorial changes	Sudan recaptures the entirety of the Heglig oil field and town

Belligerents
South Sudan	Sudan

Commanders and leaders
Salva Kiir	Omar al-Bashir

Strength
Unknown	1,000 soldiers
- Heglig within Sudan.

The Second Battle of Heglig was an armed confrontation of the Heglig Crisis that broke out on 10 April 2012.

== Conflict ==
After claiming that Sudan had been harassing its forces from the air and the use of artillery, South Sudan ordered its forces to attack the Sudanese army in the Heglig area in retaliation.

The Sudan People's Liberation Army launched an offensive northwards, claiming they were chasing retreating Sudanese army units that had attacked South Sudanese territory. The forces from Sudan held defensive positions in and around Heglig and clashes ensued when the South Sudanese army reached the area and engaged them.

After a day of fierce clashes, Sudan admitted that they had been defeated by the South's armed forces despite having put up stiff resistance against "Huge, well equipped forces" from South Sudan.

South Sudanese forces began reinforcing their positions in Heglig on 13 April, whilst Sudan continued to mobilise its own forces. According to the South Sudanese government, the frontlines had remained static during the day. Sudanese forces claimed to be advancing on Heglig and that the situation would be dealt with "within hours." A spokesman of the Sudanese government said that its army was on the outskirts of Heglig, while South Sudan's government said that it would defend themselves if attacked. The Sudanese government spokesman also added that South Sudan failed to control "all of South Kordofan state."

Sudanese warplanes bombed Heglig on 15 April, with Southern officials accusing the North of "bombing the central processing facility to rubble". Sudan strongly denied the claims.

On 20 April 2012 the Sudanese armed forces entered Heglig and controlled the oil field The Sudanese army claimed to have killed over 1,000 South Sudanese soldiers at Heglig. The death toll however is impossible to verify but an AFP correspondent in Heglig said the putrid bodies of dead South Sudanese lay beneath trees scattered about the area. He said the number of bodies was so large they were "uncountable". He also said, the corpses bore the South Sudanese flag on their uniforms. Earlier in the occupation one Southern soldier in Bentiu, capital of the South's Unity state, said: "There are so many bodies at the front line, so many dead" that it is impossible to bury them or bring them back. South Sudan denied these claims .

== See also ==
- List of border conflicts
