= Jau, South Sudan =

Jau
- Town
- Location within South Sudan
- Coordinates: 10°16′26.8″N 29°59′52.1″E
- Country: South Sudan
- State: Ruweng Administrative Area
- County: Abiemnom County
- Time zone: UTC+2 (CAT)

Jau is a town in Ruweng Administrative Area. Whether it belongs to the territory of Sudan or South Sudan is controversial.
