= Rubkona =

- Town
- Location in South Sudan
- Coordinates: 9.293485°N 29.789198°E
- Country: South Sudan
- Region: Greater Upper Nile
- State: Unity State
- County: Rubkona County
- Elevation: 1,300 ft (400 m)

Population (2006 Estimate)
  - Total: 7,700
- Time zone: UTC+2 (CAT)

Rubkona (or Rub Kona, Rub-Koni) is a town in the Rubkona County of Unity State, in the Greater Upper Nile region of South Sudan. It lies on the northern bank of the Bahr el Ghazal River, connected via the El Salaam Bridge (The Peace Bridge) to the state capital, Bentiu. This bridge was bombed by North Sudanese MiG-29 bomber airplanes on April 23, 2012, during the Heglig Crisis. Rubkona is the administrative center of Rubkona County.

During the Second Sudanese Civil War (1983-2005), conditions were extremely poor and dangerous. Refugees from the countryside moved to the town for greater safety. After the peace agreement was signed in January 2005, there have been great improvements. However, most of those improvements were destroyed following the outbreak of the South Sudanese Civil War in 2013. It previously had a large market, and roads to the south were being greatly improved prior to the war. In the rainy season, Rubkona is flooded. People must move from one part of town to another to escape the water.

Bentiu Airport is located just north of Rubkona. Few kilometres north of the town, is also the UNMISS main base in Unity state where Protection of Civilian Sites (POCs) are being hosted. As of September 2020, approximately 167,856 IDPs were reportedly residing within the five PoC, or former-PoC, sites.
