= Health in South Sudan =

South Sudan has one of the weakest health systems in the world, marked by a severely degraded public health system, shortages of qualified health workers, and restricted access to care. These problems have been shaped by decades of conflict, poverty, low literacy, and the country's largely rural economy, in which much of the population depends on subsistence farming or animal husbandry.

Even before independence, South Sudan had some of the worst health indicators in the world, a situation that has persisted since then. Neonatal and maternal mortality rates remain among the highest globally, while life expectancy is low. In 2016, South Sudan had the second-lowest expected human capital among 195 countries, with people expected to live the equivalent of 2 fully healthy, educated, and productive years between ages 20 and 64, up from 1 year in 1990.

The country's health burden includes widespread malaria, recurrent cholera outbreaks, food insecurity, and undernutrition. Conflict and insecurity have further weakened the health system, damaging facilities, reducing access to basic services, and restricted humanitarian access.

== Health system ==
=== Structure and administration ===
South Sudan's health system is structured into three main service tiers: Primary Health Care Units (PHCUs), Primary Health Care Centres (PHCCs), and hospitals operated at the state, county, police, or military level.

Health service delivery operates across four levels: community, primary, secondary, and tertiary. Community-level services are provided in villages by trained local personnel. The primary level includes PHCUs and PHCCs, which deliver the Basic Package of Health Services (BPHS). The BPHS encompasses preventive, curative, health promotion, and basic administrative services. The government finances it, the Multi-Donor Trust Fund (MDTF), and various NGOs. These services are intended to be free and accessible to the majority of the population at both the primary and secondary levels.

The Ministry of Health (MoH) administers a decentralized healthcare system in line with the Interim Constitution of South Sudan (2005) and the Local Government Act (2009). This system is organized across four administrative levels: national, state, county, and community. The national Ministry is responsible for policy development, strategic leadership, funding, and monitoring and evaluation. State governments oversee the implementation and coordination of healthcare services at the county and community levels.

In 2021, South Sudan's domestic general government health expenditure was 2.1% of general government expenditure, unchanged from 2020. In 2022, the country had 0.41 medical doctors, 6.9 nursing and midwifery personnel, 0.03 dentists, and 0.15 pharmacists per 10,000 people. The density of nursing and midwifery personnel had increased since 2018, while the density of pharmacists had declined. Furthermore, healthcare workers in South Sudan are unevenly distributed, with Central Equatoria having the highest concentration. Rural areas, where most of the population lives, remain especially underserved and have limited health resources.

=== Effects of conflict on the health system ===
At independence, the country's public health system had been severely weakened by prolonged violence and instability, and effective health service coverage remained below 25%. After independence, efforts were made to move away from emergency oriented, health systems largely run by international NGOs toward more sustainable services overseen by the Ministry of Health in South Sudan. Despite these reforms, two years later, international NGOs still provided more than 80% of available healthcare. As of 2022, armed conflict continued to severely reduce access to basic health services for much of the population in South Sudan. The impacts included damage to health facilities, the killing of health workers, widespread malnutrition affecting children, rising mental and psychosocial conditions, and recurrent disease outbreaks and public health emergencies. Despite humanitarian assistance, prolonged conflict continued to erode and exhaust the skilled health workforce, limiting the country's capacity to deliver care. Humanitarian operations were also constrained by insecurity, attacks on aid workers, looting of supplies and equipment, and major logistical obstacles.

==== Aboko County ====
In Akobo County, 7 of the 15 health facilities were out of service because of conflict-related damage. These included Walgak PHCC, which was reportedly struck in an air attack, and Tangnyang PHCC, which was vandalized during recent clashes. Another major concern was declining immunity to disease, as ongoing conflict had delayed or disrupted vaccination campaigns while the risk of measles, cholera, meningitis, and severe acute malnutrition remained.

Akobo was facing a growing water crisis after solar panels were looted and destroyed at the town's main pumping station, leaving it out of operation and sharply reducing access to safe water while many people had been displaced and conditions had become increasingly precarious.

===== Médecins Sans Frontières evacuation =====
Since March 2025, facilities supported by Médecins Sans Frontières (MSF) in Akobo County have faced 12 security incidents, leading to the closure of three hospitals, with three more attacks recorded in the opening months of 2026. On 7 March 2026, MSF announced that it was evacuating its team from Akobo County following a government order, a move that disrupted malaria season preparations, routine vaccinations, and basic health services for displaced people and local residents. MSF said the evacuation reflected a wider pattern of attacks on health care and warned that the closure of Akobo Hospital would leave thousands without primary care, including around 200 women each month without skilled delivery services, among them an estimated 30 cases requiring emergency obstetric care.

=== USAID ===
US assistance has accounted for more than half of total foreign aid received by South Sudan. In early 2025, health services in South Sudan suffered a major setback following cuts to United States Agency for International Development (USAID) funding initiated under President Donald Trump's "America First" policy. These cuts led to the closure of seven out of 27 Save the Children-supported clinics in Jonglei State and forced 20 others to reduce services, resulting in the layoff of roughly 200 health workers. In April 2025, Save the Children reported that five children were among eight people who died after walking for hours in extreme heat to reach medical care for cholera. A US-funded patient transport service had also been shut down. USAID had previously supported critical interventions for cholera, malnutrition, malaria, and HIV/AIDS, but over 90% of its contracts were reportedly canceled. While the US State Department maintained that some humanitarian projects were still active, it cited widespread corruption in South Sudan's government as a barrier to continued support.

Apart from the United States, other major donors to South Sudan have already reduced funding or indicated that cuts are forthcoming. In the second half of 2024, the UK announced significant reductions, and the Swedish government shut its Cooperation Office in South Sudan. In response, international organizations have withheld funds to preserve their own viability, further constraining national actors working on the front lines.

Sudanese and South Sudanese civil society actors responded to the international aid cuts with strong concern over their immediate humanitarian consequences, particularly worsening food insecurity, strain on health systems, and rising preventable deaths. At the same time, the cuts coincided with increased reliance on, and visibility of, existing grassroots response mechanisms, which these actors describe as both an established reality and a potential model for the future.

== Health indicators ==
The health situation in South Sudan is far from ideal. More than 50% of the population lives below the poverty line, and the adult literacy rate is 27%. The under-five mortality rate (U5MR) is 99 per 1,000 live births, while the broader under-five infant mortality rate is estimated at 135.3 per 1,000.

South Sudan's human resources for health are significantly below the minimum threshold recommended by the WHO. Between 2009 and 2010, there were only 189 doctors across eight states—an average of one doctor for every 65,574 people. The number of midwives was 309, or one per 39,088 population. However, estimates vary; other sources suggest a ratio of one midwife per 125,000 women.

In September 2018, The Lancet published a new measure of expected human capital for 195 countries from 1990 to 2016. For each birth cohort, it was defined as the expected years lived between ages 20 and 64, adjusted for educational attainment, learning or education quality, and functional health status. South Sudan had the second-lowest level of expected human capital, with 2 years lived between ages 20 and 64 after adjustment for health, education, and learning. This was an improvement over 1990 when its score was 1 year.

In South Sudan, life expectancy at birth increased from 51.9 years in 2000 to 58.6 years in 2021, with most of the improvement occurring between 2000 and 2012. Whereas life expectancy increased globally and in Africa between 2011 and 2021, it remained largely unchanged in South Sudan, at around 58–59 years.

Compared with other East African countries, in 2020-2024 South Sudan had a higher health facility burden from malaria, pneumonia, diarrhoea and malnutrition.

=== Maternal health ===
In 2011, access to antenatal care (ANC) was limited, with 47.6% of women attending the first visit and only 17% completing the recommended four visits.

South Sudan has one of the world's highest maternal mortality rates. The estimated number of maternal deaths in South Sudan was much higher in the late 1980s and 1990s, with several years above 10,000 and peaks of around 20,000. It fell sharply after the late 1990s, declined more gradually during the 2000s, rose again during the mid-2010s, and then decreased after 2017. In 2023, the estimate was 2,271 maternal deaths. Prolonged conflict has been cited as a factor contributing to maternal mortality in South Sudan, partly through its impact on maternity services. Most maternal deaths occur during labour, delivery, or the immediate postpartum period. These deaths are largely preventable with adequate infrastructure and the presence of skilled personnel during childbirth.

=== Child health ===
Since independence in 2011, South Sudan's infant mortality rate (the number of infants dying before reaching one year of age per 1,000 live births) initially declined slightly, from 76.1 deaths per 1,000 live births in 2011 to 72.9 in 2013. It then rose sharply during the civil war years, reaching 172.9 in 2017, before falling again. By 2025, it had declined to 56.75 deaths per 1,000 live births, below the level recorded at independence. The under-five mortality rate followed a broadly similar pattern, with the rate estimated at 99.3 deaths per 1,000 live births in 2023.

Around 75% of child deaths in South Sudan are attributed to preventable diseases, including diarrhea, malaria, pneumonia, and malnutrition. From 2020 to 2024, children under five accounted for more than 90% of inpatient admissions for communicable diseases. Infectious causes had an inpatient mortality rate of about 5 deaths per 100 hospital discharges. Malnutrition accounted for 2% of under-five admissions, with 4 deaths per 100 discharges among admitted children, and the combination of malnutrition and infection increased the risk of death.

In 2025, more than 5 million children in South Sudan needed urgent assistance because of escalating conflict, life-threatening acute malnutrition and a worsening cholera outbreak. An estimated 715,000 children were at risk of death from severe wasting without urgent nutritional support.

==== Immunization coverage ====
Since becoming independent in 2011, South Sudan has continued to record low immunization coverage by global standards, although coverage has improved in recent years. Access to immunization in South Sudan is limited by long distances to vaccination sites, insecurity and poorly functioning health facilities. Only 26% of children received all recommended vaccinations in 2010, a slight decline from 27% in 2006. In 2024, coverage varied widely across the country. The reporting rates for the Expanded Programme on Immunization, the routine immunization system known as EPI, exceeded 80% in 24 of South Sudan's 80 counties, while 33 counties reported rates of 60% to 79%, and 23 counties reported rates below 60%. Penta 3 coverage, the share of eligible children who received the third dose of the pentavalent vaccine, reached at least 95% in 41 counties, but remained below 80% in 31 counties. Measles coverage was generally lower, with first-dose measles coverage below 80% in 49 counties. The country also had a large number of zero-dose children, especially in western and northern areas, with cases reported in 66 counties and many counties recording rates above 20%.

=== Male health ===
From 2020 to 2024, male patients had higher mortality than female patients across all major disease categories. Mortality was 6 deaths per 100 hospital discharges for communicable diseases, compared with 4 among female patients; 8 deaths per 100 discharges for noncommunicable diseases, compared with 6; and 3 deaths per 100 discharges for injuries, compared with 2.

=== Community deaths ===
"Community deaths" are deaths that happen outside of hospital. They bypass official records and therefore hide the true scale of the country's health situation. This lack of data leaves authorities without the evidence needed for effective public health interventions. Between 2020 and 2024, nearly four-fifths of deaths in South Sudan happened outside of health facilities. Regional data shows extreme variation, with some areas reaching a 98% community death rate and over half of the country's regions exceeding the national average. Areas characterized by sparse health facility networks, low population density, and recurrent flooding, including Abyei, Greater Pibor, Jonglei, and parts of Upper Nile, report the highest proportions of community deaths.

The likelihood of dying at home in South Sudan is shaped by a mix of healthcare factors and social environment. While closer proximity to clinics reduces home deaths, factors like high malaria rates, lack of maternal education, wealth gaps, and regional conflict significantly increase them. Furthermore, home births and child medical consultations also show strong statistical links to higher home mortality rates. Especially the high share of malaria related community deaths indicates shortcomings in timely diagnosis and treatment at the most basic levels of the health system.

== Water, sanitation, and hygiene ==
Access to safe water and sanitation in South Sudan is among the lowest in the world, and poor water, sanitation, and hygiene (WASH) conditions are cited by the World Bank as the second-leading cause of death and disability in the country. National access to piped water is estimated at only 4% (10% in urban areas and 3% in rural areas), with boreholes and water trucking serving as the predominant, and often inadequate, alternatives. Only around 11% of the population has access to improved sanitation facilities, among the lowest coverage rates globally, and an estimated 61% of the population practises open defecation (8% in urban areas and 73% in rural areas). Only about 6% of households have a designated handwashing station with soap and water. UNICEF estimates that 59% of the population lacks access to safe water overall, forcing many families to rely on unsafe sources.

Urban water supply is managed mainly by the South Sudan Urban Water Corporation, but coverage varies sharply between towns; as of 2024, estimated coverage ranged from about 1% in Bor and 2% in Juba to 44% in Malakal, with local governments or private operators supplying water in other towns. WASH infrastructure in institutions is similarly weak: about a third of schools lack access to even basic drinking water, only around 37% have basic sanitation facilities, and just 18% offer handwashing facilities with soap and water, while data on WASH conditions in health care facilities remains largely insufficient.

Displacement compounds the gaps in service. In refugee-hosting areas, only about 54% of refugees have access to basic drinking water, with lower access in the south of the country (38%) than in the more structured, aid-supported camps in the north (59%). Access to basic sanitation among refugees is similarly uneven, at 48% in northern camps and 25% in the south, while host communities near northern camps fare worse still, with only around 13% having access to basic sanitation. The lack of safe water and sanitation also carries protection risks: women and girls who must travel long distances to collect water or firewood face heightened risk of assault and sexual violence, particularly in flood-affected and conflict-affected areas, and humanitarian agencies have reported that fear of attack leads many women to avoid essential water points, washrooms, and collection sites altogether.

Poor WASH access is closely linked to the country's disease burden. Recurrent cholera outbreaks have been reported almost every year since 2013, disproportionately affecting children under five, and a 2023 outbreak centred on Malakal following an influx of refugees from Sudan resulted in more than 28,000 cases and over 640 deaths. Trachoma also remains endemic, with active infection recorded in 34 of 50 mapped counties and prevalence reaching as high as 80% in some communities; public health officials consider elimination of the disease achievable only through improved WASH services.

In response, the Government of South Sudan, represented by President Salva Kiir, signed the Sanitation and Water for All Heads of State Compact on Water and Sanitation on 3 June 2024, committing to pass a long-delayed comprehensive Water Bill, end open defecation by 2030 through an Open Defecation Free roadmap, and increase budget allocation and donor coordination for the sector. Access to basic water supply in the country had fallen from 41% in 2010 to 39% in 2020 even as access to basic sanitation rose from 7% to 14% and the rate of open defecation declined from 71% to 63% over the same period, according to the WHO/UNICEF Joint Monitoring Programme for Water Supply, Sanitation and Hygiene. To support these commitments, the World Bank approved concept-stage financing in December 2024 for a National Water Supply, Sanitation, and Hygiene Project, worth approximately US$87 million, aimed at expanding water and sanitation infrastructure in prioritised urban centres including Aweil, Bentiu, Kuajok, and Rumbek, as well as in rural areas and refugee-hosting communities, alongside institutional reform and capacity building for the Ministry of Water Resources and Irrigation. Other major WASH sector donors include the African Development Bank, the Japan International Cooperation Agency, German development cooperation through KfW, USAID, and the government of the Netherlands.

== Food insecurity and undernutrition ==
In South Sudan, from independence, food insecurity and undernutrition have been widespread, with children especially affected and stunted growth remaining high in some regions. Undernutrition has been driven by a combination of conflict, displacement, poor infrastructure, economic instability, and environmental pressures. These factors have disrupted food production and humanitarian aid delivery, while also limiting access to health care and reliable nutrition support. The 2017 South Sudan famine occurred after several years of food insecurity and affected an estimated five million people, just under half the national population.

In 2025, food security improved in some conflict free areas due to better harvests and sustained humanitarian assistance, highlighting the role of stability. However, 7.7 million people, or 57% of South Sudan's population, continued to face acute food insecurity, with conflict remaining the main driver. Malnutrition also worsened, with 2.3 million children at risk of acute malnutrition, amid access constraints, health service disruptions, and a cholera outbreak affecting Upper Nile and Unity states.

=== Upper Nile crisis and famine risk ===
In June 2025, conflict in Upper Nile State, including fighting along the Nile River, sharply worsened food security conditions in South Sudan, placing two counties, Nasir and Ulang, at risk of famine in a worst-case scenario. Fighting that escalated from March led to widespread displacement, destroyed livelihoods, and severely restricted humanitarian access. According to the latest IPC analysis, people in 11 of Upper Nile's 13 counties faced emergency levels of hunger, with around 32,000 people in catastrophic conditions, more than triple earlier projections. Overall, 66% of the state's population was experiencing crisis, emergency, or catastrophic food insecurity.

== Communicable diseases ==
The country has a high burden of both communicable diseases (such as malaria, tuberculosis, HIV/AIDS) and non-communicable diseases (NCDs). The latter was estimated to have caused 28% of deaths in 2019. Limited access to safe water and sanitation contributes to the spread of communicable diseases in South Sudan, including diarrhoeal diseases and cholera. In 2024, 40% of the population had access to at least basic drinking water services, while 14% had access to at least basic sanitation services.

=== Malaria ===
South Sudan experiences malaria transmission throughout the year across all regions, and the disease remains a major cause of illness and mortality among children under five years of age. From 2020 to 2024, malaria accounted for 31% of deaths recorded in health facilities and 57% of inpatient admissions. Among children under five, the case fatality rate was 2 deaths per 100 malaria cases. As in other countries in the East African region, malaria transmission showed strong seasonal variation, with incidence rising sharply during the rainy seasons.

As of 2013, South Sudan had one of the highest malaria burdens in sub-Saharan Africa, with malaria remaining endemic in all 10 administrative states through 2012. Although the Ministry of Health had improved coordination of malaria control and secured major external funding, the disease continued to cause widespread illness and death. In 2016, malaria was the leading cause of morbidity in the country, accounting for 69% of all reported cases of illness. Malaria has continued to pose a major public health challenge in South Sudan, with an estimated 3 million cases reported in 2021 and 7,344 associated deaths. As of November 2025, malaria transmission remained a major challenge for public health.

Malaria control efforts are undermined by large scale displacement, including refugees, returnees, and internally displaced people, as well as natural disasters such as flooding. These pressures further strain a health system weakened by years of conflict and risk reversing gains that have already been made. Renewed fighting in 2016 disrupted malaria control by halting programme activities, restricting or destroying access to health facilities, and worsening shortages of antimalarial medicines. Although the programme later recovered, persistent challenges continue to create gaps in malaria prevention and treatment.

=== Cholera ===
Cholera is mainly transmitted through polluted water and can cause sudden, severe diarrhoea that leads to rapid dehydration and death without treatment. The disease worsens malnutrition by draining the body of essential nutrients. This further weakens patients and creates a cycle in which malnutrition slows recovery and heightens the risk of prolonged illness. Cholera has been a recurring public health problem in Sudan, with outbreaks fuelled by conflict, deficient water, sanitation, and hygiene, and a poorly resourced healthcare system.

South Sudan experienced five cholera outbreaks between 2014 and 2023. These varied widely in scale, with reported case numbers ranging from 424 to 20,038 and fatalities from 1 to 436. Over this period, the case fatality rate ranged between 0.14% and 2.6%. The largest outbreak lasted 14 months, from June 2016 to August 2017, and resulted in a national attack rate of 1.8 per 1,000 inhabitants. After the 2017 outbreak, no community transmission was reported until 2022. The two subsequent outbreaks were limited to single counties, affecting Rubkona in 2022 and Malakal in 2023.

Flooding and conflict driven displacement has increased population movement, which has helped spread cholera within and between counties. Overcrowding in camps or temporary settlements, combined with limited health services, has worsened transmission. In many areas, especially camp like settings, inadequate access to safe water and improved sanitation forces reliance on unsafe sources and contributes to open defecation, further amplifying cholera spread.

The most recent and ongoing cholera outbreak began in October 2024 in Renk County near the border with Sudan, with initial cases detected among returning citizens and refugees. By January 2025, reports indicated 22,628 cases across 33 of the 80 counties, affecting 7 states and 1 administrative area, many of them located along the Nile. The majority of infections, 84%, are limited to six counties, with Rubkona representing nearly 50% of the nationwide burden. The outbreak has primarily affected children and young adults. More than 50% of reported cases occurred in children under 15 years, including 30% in children under 5 years. Infection rates were similar among men and women. By October 2025, this outbreak had become the worst in the history of South Sudan, with in 95,450 reported cases and 1,587 deaths, corresponding to a case fatality rate of 1.7%. By March 2026, the outbreak had resulted in 100,646 reported cholera cases and 1,652 deaths overall.

The funding cuts by USAID starting in 2025 weakened the cholera response during the ongoing epidemic. They led to disrupted surveillance, rationing of treatment, and the loss of essential services in affected communities. According to humanitarian and former US officials, these reductions coincided with a reversal of declining case trends and contributed to a renewed surge in cholera cases and preventable deaths.

=== HIV/AIDS ===
HIV is a retrovirus that attacks the immune system. If untreated, HIV can progress to AIDS. HIV is transmitted through the bodily fluids of an infected person, including blood, breast milk, semen, and vaginal fluids, and can also be passed from a mother to her child.

In 2011, HIV/AIDS was the leading cause of death with almost 120 deaths per 100,000 population; by 2021, the number had fallen to 76. In 2021, mortality was higher among women than men, at 85.4 and 67 deaths per 100,000 population, respectively.

In 2018, only 24% of people living with HIV were aware of their status, and just 16% were receiving treatment. That year, the HIV epidemic in South Sudan was classified as low and generalized, at 2.7 percent, with pockets of higher prevalence of 5 percent or more among high-risk populations. The epidemic was highly uneven across regions and was geographically concentrated in the southern states of the greater Equatorial region.That year, clients of sex workers were linked to roughly 42% of newly recorded HIV cases, while men and women engaged in casual sexual relationships represented about 14.5%. Female sex workers accounted for 11.2% of new cases, and mother-to-child transmission was responsible for approximately 15.7%.

The CDC has worked in South Sudan since 2006 to support HIV and AIDS prevention and treatment through PEPFAR, including expanding services at health facilities, strengthening laboratory capacity, and improving national surveillance systems. In 2025, it continued to deliver lifesaving HIV services, including diagnosis and the provision of antiretroviral therapy.

=== Pneumonia ===
Pneumonia is an inflammatory condition of the lung primarily affecting the small air sacs known as alveoli. It is the leading infectious cause of death among children worldwide. Children whose immune defenses are compromised by illness or malnutrition, as well as those exposed to polluted air and unsafe water, face a substantially higher risk. In South Sudan in 2017, most child pneumonia deaths were associated with acute malnutrition, many were also linked to indoor air pollution, and a smaller share involved chronic malnutrition. These risk factors frequently overlapped in the same children. In 2018, pneumonia accounted for about one fifth of all child deaths. In 2021, pneumonia and other lower respiratory infections became the leading cause of death after HIV/AIDS declined, with a combined mortality rate of 88 deaths per 100,000 population.

=== Tuberculosis ===
Tuberculosis is a contagious disease that mainly affects the lungs. Tuberculosis outcomes have improved steadily since 2015. By 2021, treatment success had reached 82%, while the estimated incidence was 227 cases per 100,000 people. Over the same period, mortality from tuberculosis excluding HIV coinfection declined from 54 to 28 deaths per 100,000 population, and deaths among people with HIV and tuberculosis fell from 13 to 8.5 per 100,000.

=== Neglected tropical diseases ===
Neglected tropical diseases are a diverse group of tropical infections that are common in low-income populations in certain developing regions. South Sudan has ongoing, locally established transmission of all five neglected tropical diseases that can be controlled through preventive mass drug administration, namely lymphatic filariasis, onchocerciasis, soil-transmitted helminthiasis, schistosomiasis and trachoma. In 2021, about 6 million received treatment.

At independence, there were still cases of dracunculiasis, but following the launch of the global elimination programme, South Sudan reported zero human cases in 2017.

==== Kala-azar ====
Kala-azar is a neglected tropical disease. It causes immense human suffering and deaths. After malaria, kala-azar is the second-largest parasitic killer in the world, responsible for an estimated 20,000 to 30,000 deaths each year worldwide.

A major outbreak in South Sudan began in 2009, peaked in 2011, and over time caused more than 32,000 cases, particularly among children. The overall case-fatality rate was 4%. It was treated as a humanitarian emergency and prompted a broad relief response. South Sudan faced another kala-azar outbreak in 2014 after the conflict that began in December 2013, with thousands of cases reported. Following the introduction of the same response measures, case numbers generally declined over the following years, although the pattern remained uneven and difficult to predict. In 2018, kala-azar was endemic in four parts of South Sudan: Upper Nile, Jonglei, Unity, and Eastern Equatoria, putting more than two million people at risk.

In May 2025, South Sudan and several other countries signed an African Union-led agreement to eliminate kala-azar and backed closer regional cooperation to advance elimination goals.

== Non-communicable diseases ==
From 2020 to 2024, noncommunicable diseases accounted for 7% of both hospital admissions and deaths. Stroke and cancers, including liver and colon cancer, had some of the highest mortality rates, with liver cancer reaching 27 deaths per 100 hospital discharges.

== Mental health ==
Decades of conflict, displacement, and repeated humanitarian emergencies have left South Sudan with one of the largest mental health gaps in the world. The South Sudan Health Cluster has estimated that around 1.2 million people are in need of mental health support, yet only about 1% of the population is able to access mental health services, leaving a treatment gap of roughly 99%. According to the World Health Organization, more than one in five people in conflict-affected areas globally live with some form of mental health condition, ranging from mild depression and anxiety to post-traumatic stress disorder, and humanitarian workers in South Sudan describe depression and anxiety as the most commonly reported symptoms among patients receiving support.

The country's mental health workforce is severely constrained. The World Health Organization has reported that South Sudan has only two practising psychiatrists nationally, alongside one psychiatric nurse, around 30 psychologists, and roughly 20 community mental health workers. Formal psychiatric care is concentrated in a small number of facilities in Juba, leaving the great majority of the population, most of whom live in rural areas, without access to specialist services. Because of this shortage, the World Health Organization, the Ministry of Health, and partner agencies such as the International Organization for Migration (IOM) have prioritised the Mental Health Gap Action Programme (mhGAP), which trains general doctors, clinical officers, and nurses at primary healthcare level to identify and manage common mental, neurological, and substance use disorders rather than relying on specialist referral. In November 2024, for example, IOM and the Ministry of Health delivered a five-day mhGAP training for ten health workers in Unity State to strengthen detection and referral of mental health conditions at primary health care centres in Bentiu and surrounding areas.

Mental health and psychosocial support (MHPSS) services are provided mainly through humanitarian actors rather than the formal health system. IOM leads or co-leads MHPSS technical working groups with the Ministry of Health in Unity, Upper Nile, and Western Bahr el Ghazal states, coordinating community-based psychosocial support, psychological first aid, and referral pathways alongside protection and gender-based violence services. In Balliet County, an IOM-led MHPSS programme responding to displacement provided individual psychological support to nearly 1,200 people at risk, psychosocial first aid to more than 2,300 people, and group social and creative activities to more than 44,000 participants in a single year. Since 2016, IOM has also delivered MHPSS services in major displacement sites including Bentiu and Malakal.

The population most affected includes survivors of conflict-related violence, internally displaced people, and refugees. Needs assessments among South Sudanese refugees in northern Uganda found that the most commonly reported psychosocial problems were persistent "overthinking" (rumination), inter-ethnic conflict, and child abuse, alongside family separation, substance use, poverty, and the presence of unaccompanied minors, while formal mental health services in the settlements remained very limited relative to need. A multi-country retrospective review of MHPSS programmes for survivors of violence in conflict-affected African states, including South Sudan, found that people who had experienced rape, caretaker neglect, or internal displacement, and those referred within three months of an incident, tended to present with the highest levels of psychological distress before receiving care.

Cultural and social factors further limit help-seeking. Reporting from Juba notes that mental health remains a subject many South Sudanese are reluctant to discuss openly, which humanitarian workers say contributes to under-reporting and to people suffering in silence rather than seeking care. A review of mental health and psychosocial wellbeing among South Sudanese refugees and displaced people found that the formal mental health system remains rudimentary, with services delivered mainly by non-governmental organizations, and that in refugee settlements a layered model has developed combining community-based support from refugee volunteers, brief culturally adapted psychological therapies, and basic psychiatric care within primary health facilities.

== See also ==
- List of hospitals in South Sudan
