= Heglig Crisis =

War fought between Sudan and South Sudan

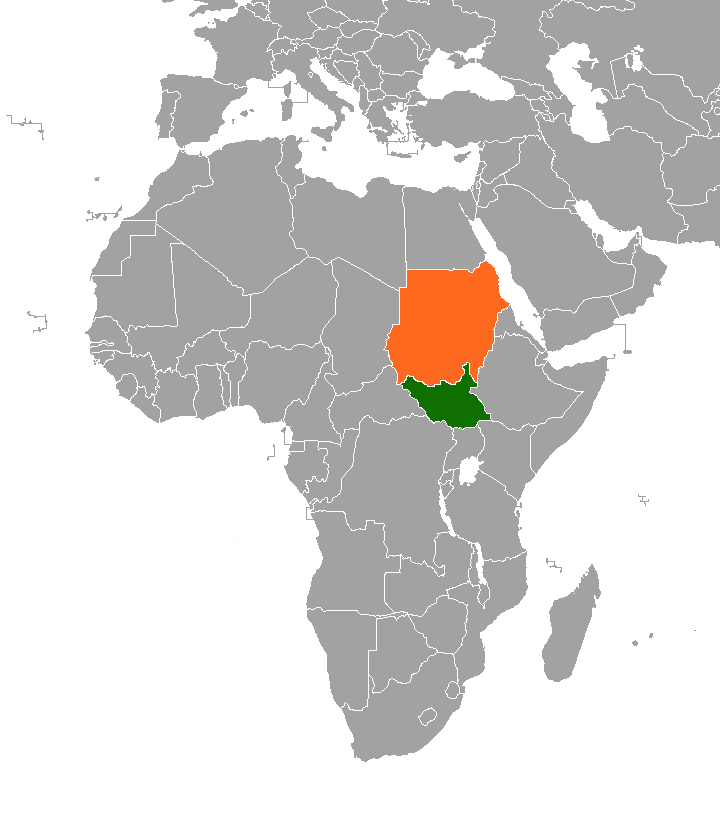
| Date | 26 March – 26 September 2012 (6 months) |
| Location | Along the entire Sudan–South Sudan border, although the main fighting took place at Heglig |
| Result | Sudanese victory: Agreement on borders and natural resources signed on 26 September |
| Territorial changes | South Sudanese withdrawal from Heglig |

Belligerents
| South Sudan; JEM SPLM-N | Sudan |

Commanders and leaders
| Salva Kiir (South Sudan) James Gatduel Gatluak | Omar al-Bashir (Sudan) Ahmed Haroun |

Strength
| SPLA and Mathiang Anyoor: unknown (at Heglig); Overall: 140,000 soldiers 110 tanks 69 artillery pieces 10 helicopters | SAF: 2,000 (at Heglig); Overall: 109,300 soldiers 17,500 paramilitaries 390 tanks 115 light tanks 490 armoured personnel carriers 778 artillery pieces 63 combat airplanes 29 helicopters |

Casualties and losses
| 31 killed (South Sudanese claim); 1,200 killed (Sudanese claim); 106 wounded (other sources); Several captured (other sources) | 256 killed (South Sudanese claim); 100 wounded 50 captured (Sudanese claim); 1 MiG-29 shot down |
- 29 civilians killed
- The casualty numbers are based on the warring parties claims and have not been independently verified.

The Heglig Crisis was a brief war fought between the countries of Sudan and South Sudan in 2012 over oil-rich regions between South Sudan's Unity and Sudan's South Kordofan states. South Sudan invaded and briefly occupied the small border town of Heglig before being pushed back by the Sudanese army. Small-scale clashes continued until an agreement on borders and natural resources was signed on 26 September, resolving most aspects of the conflict.

== Background ==
Prior to independence from Sudan two civil wars were fought in the region from 1955 to 1972 and from 1983 to 2005, in which 2.5 million people were killed and more than 5 million externally displaced. South Sudan peacefully gained independence from Sudan on 9 July 2011 with Sudan's long-term president Omar al-Bashir promising to "work with our southern brothers and help them set up their state". Despite this relations between the two states have been marked by conflict over the disputed oil-rich Abyei region. In January 2012, South Sudan shut down all of its oil fields over a disagreement with oil transit fees imposed by Sudan.

International arbitration committees such as the Abyei Boundaries Commission 2005 and the Permanent Court of Arbitration 2009 did not definitively resolve the question of administrative control over Heglig, as the dispute remained linked to whether the area lay east or west of the 1931 administrative line.

In May 2011, it was reported that Sudan had seized control of Abyei, with a force of approximately 5,000 soldiers after three days of clashes with South Sudanese forces. The precipitating factor was an ambush by South Sudanese forces on May 19 which killed 22 northern soldiers. The northern advance included shelling, aerial bombardment and numerous tanks. Following the advance South Sudan withdrew its forces from Abyei and declared the movement of Sudanese forces into Abyei to be an "act of war". The United Nations sent an envoy to Khartoum to intervene. A deal on militarization was reached on 20 June 2011. The United Nations Interim Security Force for Abyei, consisting of Ethiopian troops were deployed under a UNSC resolution from 27 June 2011. In early December 2011, Jau, a town in Unity state in South Sudan, was occupied by Sudanese forces. In early March 2012, the Sudanese Air Force bombed parts of Pariang county.

Both countries accused each other of supporting rebels on their soil as part of the ongoing internal conflicts in Sudan and South Sudan.

The national parliament in 1980 and the government in Khartoum in 2004 made administrative and map changes to annex the oil fields to Western Kordofan.

== Events ==
=== March: South Sudanese repulsed from Heglig ===
On 26 March, the Republic of Sudan claimed that South Sudan attacked the Heglig oilfield, located in the Sudanese state of South Kordofan, while South Sudan claimed that their forces had carried out an operation within the borders of South Sudan. The South Sudanese attack was supported by the Sudanese rebel group JEM, which attacked from South Sudanese state of Unity. The following day, the Sudanese Air Force launched a bombing raid on the Unity oilfield in Unity, located to the north of the state capital, Bentiu. The Sudanese Army later attacked the disputed areas of Jau, Pan Akuach, and Teshwin, but were repelled by the South Sudanese Sudan People's Liberation Army (SPLA).

South Sudanese artillery positions 20 kilometres north of Bentiu, which had been involved in the shelling of Heglig, were bombarded by artillery from the northern side of the border. Sudan's Information Minister, Abdallah Ali Masar, confirmed that South Sudanese had penetrated 10 km into Sudanese territory, but also claimed that Sudanese forces had repelled them and driven them back, and had taken several prisoners.

South Sudan's forces withdrew from the disputed area on 28 March.

On 31 March, Sudanese warplanes bombed the Southern forces positions on the border, although officials from the north said it was artillery, not aircraft involved in the attack.

=== Early April: South Sudanese capture of Heglig ===
South Sudan claimed to have shot down a Sudanese MiG-29 warplane on 4 April over Unity during an air raid in which Sudanese planes bombed an oil pipeline in South Sudan. The Sudanese government denied any aerial bombings had taken place and called the accusations "fabrications" by South Sudan.

The SPLA claimed that Teshwin in South Sudan had been attacked by Sudanese forces on 9 April with battle going on into the next day The town of Abiemnhom in Unity was reportedly attacked by two brigades from the Sudanese army, which South Sudan claimed was an attempt to seize its oil fields. At least four civilians were injured in the clashes, although there were no immediate reports of military casualties on either side. The South's government said that northern forces had breached the border accompanied by militias, but had been repelled. A Sudanese military spokesman later admitted that the Sudanese army had been defeated during a battle at Heglig and was forced to retreat northwards. There were some reports that the fighting had broken out after Sudanese forces attempted to retake a border post lost to Southern forces two weeks previous. On 10 April Colonel Khalid Sawarmi, spokesman for the Sudanese army, claimed that South Sudanese forces had taken control of the Heglig oil fields and the town of Heglig itself, marking the start of the Second Battle of Heglig. In this second capture of Heglig the SPLA was again supported by the JEM.

The Sudanese government said on 11 April that heavy fighting continued along the disputed border areas and the Sudanese army was reported to be trying to retake Heglig with Sudan announcing that they would use all legitimate means to retake the oil fields. South Sudan said that they were holding defensive positions in Heglig, awaiting a Sudanese counterattack. Second Vice President of Sudan, al-Haj Adam Youssef, stated that Sudan was now in a state declared that all negotiations between the two states were on hold. The next day, on 12 April, the Sudanese Air Force bombed Bentiu, in an attempt to destroy a strategic bridge using an Antonov An-26 transport plane converted into an improvised bomber, killing one South Sudanese soldier.

The parliaments of both countries called for a mobilisation of their respective armed forces. Sudan also began a general mobilisation of its armed forces as South Sudanese forces penetrated as far as 70 kilometres into Sudanese territory, according to Rahmatullah Mohamed Osman, Under Secretary for the Foreign Ministry of Sudan. Following the capture of Heglig, the Government of Sudan announced that their forces withdrawn to Khersana where they were reportedly preparing to retake Heglig. On the same day the Sudanese Revolutionary Front rebel group attacked Khersana and Kalik

It was at some point in April that Salva Kiir, President of South Sudan and his advisors organized an all-volunteer militia –Mathiang Anyoor– to aid the SPLA in fighting the Sudanese during this conflict. The militia later transformed into a private army and became infamous for committing numerous atrocities during the subsequent South Sudanese Civil War.

=== Mid-April: Sudanese counter offensive ===
South Sudanese forces began reinforcing their positions in Heglig on 13 April, whilst Sudan continued to mobilise its own forces. According to the South Sudanese government, the frontlines had remained static during the day. Sudanese forces claimed to be advancing on Heglig and that the situation would be dealt with "within hours." A spokesman of the Sudanese government said that its army was on the outskirts of Heglig, while South Sudan's government said that it would defend themselves if attacked. The Sudanese government spokesman also added that South Sudan failed to control "all of South Kordofan state."

South Sudan's vice president Reik Machar said a Sudanese attempt to retake Heglig by force was halted 30 km north of the town. South Sudan claimed to have destroyed two tanks during the clashes. The Sudanese air force, operating two Sukhoi Su-25 jets, reportedly bombed Jau and Panakuach, as well as Heglig once again, killing five civilians. On 14 April, South Sudanese forces continued to advance northwards, and repelled a Sudanese counterattack on Khersana. Southern troops moved to close all three roads to Heglig on 14 April. It was also reported that most facilities in Heglig had been damaged during the fighting. Two MiG-29s from the Sudanese Air Force attempted to destroy a bridge in Bentiu but missed their target and ended up killing four civilians and a soldier and wounding five others. The attack was widely believed to be an attempt to damage South Sudanese supply lines.

Sudanese army units were reported to have reached a few kilometres from Heglig and that they were fighting with South Sudanese forces. Sudan's military spokesman Al-Sawarmi Khalid revealed that their immediate objective was to "destroy the South's war machine", rather than enter Heglig itself. South Sudan disputed the north's version of events as propaganda, claiming that northern forces were still 30 kilometres (19 miles) from Heglig. On 15 April, the Sudan People's Liberation Army spokesman Philip Aguer claimed that after overnight clashes in Kelet South Sudan held on to its positions and destroyed two Sudanese tanks.

Sudan shelled the western part of South Sudan's Upper Nile state during 15 April, in an apparent attempt to open up a new front. Sudanese troops crossed the border into South Sudan's Upper Nile state and briefly occupied the small town of Kuek, before being expelled by South Sudan's army.

On 16 April, Sudan's parliament met and voted unanimously to declare that "South Sudan is an enemy of all Sudanese state agencies". The parliamentary speaker called for Sudan to mobilise all its resources to fight South Sudan and topple their government. Rabie Abdelaty, a spokesman for the Sudanese government, ruled out peace talks with the South, saying it would hurt national pride if Sudan did not take back Heglig by force.

On 18 April, a new front opened up in the conflict, 160 kilometres (99 mi) west of Heglig, resulting in seven South Sudanese soldiers and 15 Sudanese soldiers being killed. The clash was reportedly sparked when a South Sudanese soldier was shot dead when collecting water near the road between Aweil and Meiram.

=== Late April: Sudan regains control over Heglig ===
On April 20 Salva Kiir ordered his forces to withdraw from Heglig. On the day the Sudanese army entered Heglig with al-Bashir holding a victory rally in Khartoum. On the 22 April, more fighting broke out along the whole border as Sudanese soldiers backed by tanks and artillery launched three waves of attacks 10 kilometres (6 mi) into South Sudan. At least one South Sudanese soldier was killed and two wounded in the attack. Sudan bombed the town of Rubkona on 23 April, damaging several market stalls, in an attempt to destroy a bridge between Rubkona and neighbouring Bentiu. At least three people were killed in the raid. The following day, Kiir stated on a visit to China that Sudan had "declared war" on South Sudan.

=== Negotiations ===
Sudan and South Sudan restarted negotiations in June 2012 under mediation by the African Union's envoy Thabo Mbeki.

On 27 September, Omar al-Bashir and Salva Kiir signed eight agreements in Addis Ababa, Ethiopia, which led the way to resume important oil exports and create a 10 km (6 mi) demilitarised zone along their border. The agreements allows for the return of 350,000 barrels of South Sudanese oil to the world market. In addition, the agreements include an understanding on the parameters to follow in regards to demarcating their border, an economic-cooperation agreement and a deal to protect each other's citizens. Certain issues remained unsolved and future talks were scheduled to resolve them. Vice President Riek Machar outlined what agreements were signed, but lamented the lack of a resolution on Abyei.

United Nations Secretary-General Ban Ki-moon commended the two leaders on reaching an agreement. Ethiopian Prime Minister Hailemariam Desalegn also praised the outcome and hoped it would build momentum.

In mid-March 2013, both countries began to withdraw their forces from the border area in a bid to creating a demilitarised buffer zone and resume South Sudanese oil production for export through Sudan. In early April South Sudanese oil started to flow through pipelines in Sudan again. On 10 June Kiir accused al-Bashir of mobilising for war after al-Bashir threatened to cut oil transit through his country with Kiir stating that he would not go to war over the oil transit issue.

In October 2013, al-Bashir visited Juba to discuss the measures with Kiir. He was warmly welcomed and said that progress had been made. Kiir said that he was looking to mend relations with Sudan.

== Weapons ==
The Sudanese Army is equipped with predominantly Chinese and Soviet-made weapons while Sudan People's Liberation Army weapons vary, having few vehicles and mostly small arms. The following table should not be considered exhaustive.

| Type | (Sudan) Sudanese Armed Forces | (South Sudan) Sudan People's Liberation Army |
|---|---|---|
| Tanks | T-55, Type 62, T-72, Type 96 tank | T-55, T-72 |
| APCs/IFVs | BMP-1, BMP-2, Alvis Saladin, technicals | technicals |
| Artillery | 2A18, BM-21 | BM-21 |
| Aircraft | Su-24, Su-25, MiG-29, Nanchang A-5, Antonov An-26, Northrop F-5 | none |
| Helicopters | Bell 212, Mi-8, Mi-24 | Mi-17 |
| Small Arms, Light Weapons | Type 56, AK-47, Heckler & Koch G3, PKM, DShK, ZU-23, RPG-2, RPG-7 | AK-47, Heckler & Koch G3, PKM, DShK, ZU-23, RPG-2, RPG-7 |

== Humanitarian situation ==
The conflict had, by 14 April, forced over 100,000 people to flee their homes. Indiscriminate bombings and ground attacks by Sudanese forces on civilian areas, particularly in the Nuba Mountains, resulted in numerous deaths and injuries. Including 16 deaths and 34 injuries from aerial bombardments.

== Responses ==
=== Domestic response in Sudan ===
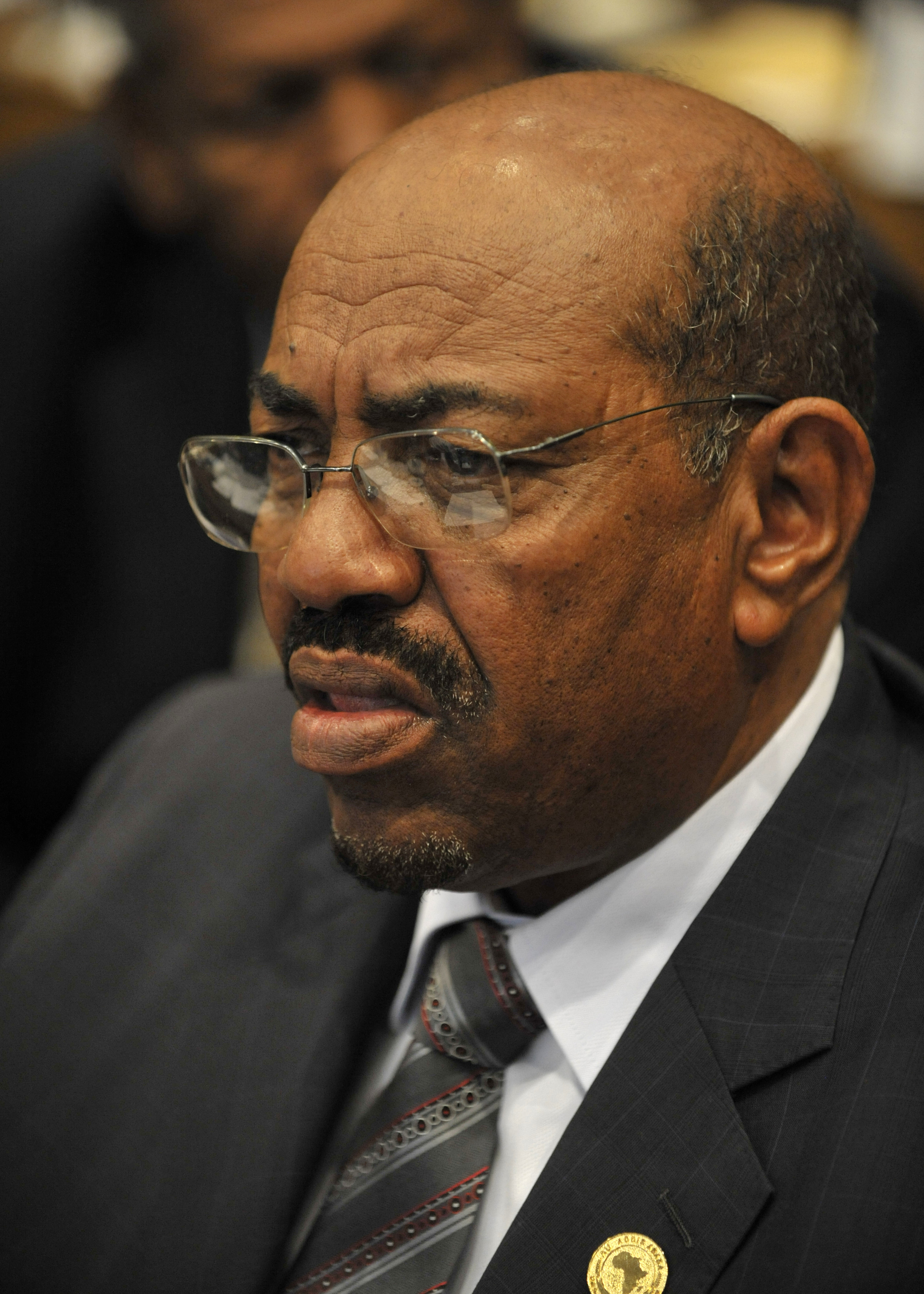
The President of Sudan, Omar al-Bashir, suspended a planned visit to South Sudan after the conflict broke out.

Sudanese national radio announced that the President of Sudan, Omar al-Bashir, would suspend his planned visit to the South Sudanese capital, Juba, as a result of the conflict. A summit between the leaders of the two countries had been planned to be held in Juba some time in April 2012, following up from the meeting of the political, military, and security committee of the African Union on 30 March in Addis Ababa, Ethiopia. A meeting between South Sudan and Sudan on the subject of the disputed region of Abyei scheduled to have been held on 22 March had previously been postponed by Sudan. On 11 April, Second Vice President of Sudan, Al-Haj Adam stated that Sudan was now in a state of war and declared that all negotiations between the two states were on hold.

On 16 April, Sudan's parliament met and voted unanimously to declare that "South Sudan is an enemy of all Sudanese state agencies" The parliamentary speaker called for Sudan to mobilise all its resources to fight South Sudan and topple their government. Rabie Abdelaty, a spokesman for the Government of Sudan, ruled out peace talks with the south, saying it would hurt national pride if Sudan did not take back Heglig by force. Sudan began a general mobilisation of its armed forces as South Sudanese forces penetrated as far as 70 kilometres into Sudanese territory, according to Rahmatullah Mohamed Osman, Under Secretary for the Foreign Ministry. During Friday prayers on 13 April in Sudan, some sermons in Khartoum condemned the South Sudanese capture of Heglig, while television broadcasts included jihadi and patriotic songs.

Following South Sudan's withdrawal from Heglig, President Omar al-Bashir declared that there would be no negotiations with the "poisonous insects" in reference to the South Sudanese. Later on, Bashir argued that the South Sudanese only understand the "language of guns and ammunition." Sudan's UN ambassador, Daffa-Alla Elhag Ali Osman, argued that Sudan had the right to act in self-defense because "We have been targeted by... the South", adding that "Let me make it clear: We will not cross the international border and attack the South... inside their territories".

=== Domestic response in South Sudan ===
The President of South Sudan, Salva Kiir, suggested that Sudan was responsible for initiating the conflict, and that further clashes could lead to war: "This morning [the Sudanese] air force came and bombed areas in Unity state. After this intensive bombardment our forces were attacked by [the Sudanese military] and militia." It is a war that has been imposed on us again, but it is [the Sudanese] who are looking for it." The spokesman for the South Sudanese military suggested that the conflict was "the biggest confrontation since independence".

Parliamentary Speaker James Wani Igga called on people to prepare for war: "Khartoum might be meaning a real war ... if you don't defend yourself, you will be finished, so you should go and mobilise the people on [the] ground to be ready" Parliament later decided to raise military spending and bolster the army by cutting salaries of all deputies by 10% for three months.

Fuel supplies began to run out in some filling stations in Juba around 15 April as huge queues of motorists tried to fill up as panic buying set in.

=== International reactions ===
- United Nations

On 27 March, a spokesman for Ban Ki-moon, the Secretary-General of the United Nations, called for the two countries to end the conflict and "use to the fullest extent existing political and security mechanisms to peacefully address their differences". On 23 April 2012, Ban Ki-moon condemned Sudan's bombing of border areas in South Sudan, demanding Khartoum cease all hostilities "as a matter of urgency".

- Arab League

On 15 April 2012, the Arab Parliament called on South Sudan for restraint and to withdraw from the town of Heglig. A statement signed by Arab Parliament head Salem Deqbasi said that the Arab Parliament's bureau called on South Sudan to "heed the voice of reason" and immediately pull its forces out of the areas it had occupied inside Sudanese territory, including Heglig. On 26 April, the Arab League escalated its rhetoric, condemning South Sudan's "aggression" and saying Heglig belongs to Sudan. The Arab League went further to say it supported Sudan's "right to defend itself", and condemned South Sudan's alleged support of rebels in Sudan.

- African Union

On 25 April 2012, the African Union condemned Sudan's bombing of parts of South Sudan, and called on both sides to cease all hostilities. The Peace and Security Council also put forth a 7-point roadmap in which the two sides would be given two weeks to restart negotiations. The AU urged both sides to refrain from "inflammatory statements and propaganda that could fuel the conflict".

- Iran

On 15 April 2012, according to IRIB World Service, an Iran Broadcasting channel, Iranian Foreign Ministry Spokesman Ramin Mehmanparast said that Iran fully monitors the developments in the region, and calls on South Sudan to immediately and unconditionally pull back its forces and return to its territory behind the designated borders. In March an Iranian surveillance drone crashed in Sudan after being fired upon by South Sudanese-backed rebels.

- Israel

Israel allegedly airlifted military hardware to the South Sudanese armed forces "on a daily basis" during the conflict.

- Kenya

On 27 March 2012, the President of Kenya, Mwai Kibaki, suggested that Kenya could mediate between the two countries, stating "Kenya is keen on good and stable relations between the two countries".

- United Kingdom

On 6 May 2012, Africa Minister Henry Bellingham supported the African Union-led initiative, calling for both sides to restart negotiations and comply with the ceasefire.

- United States

On 11 April 2012, the US State Department condemned South Sudan's seizure of Heglig and in statement said "We condemn South Sudan's military involvement in the attack on and seizure of Heglig, an act which goes beyond self-defense and has increased tensions between Sudan and South Sudan to dangerous levels." Later on, however, the US took a different tone, condemning Khartoum's bombardment of South Sudanese territory and "military incursion into South Sudan". To South Sudan, the US release recognized the "right of South Sudan to self-defense", but urged "restraint in its reaction to Sudan’s attack in Unity State". The US welcomed the South Sudanese withdrawal from Heglig and called for all South Sudanese troops to be withdrawn from areas across the 1 January 1956 border. In his message to the Sudanese and South Sudanese people, President Obama reiterated that "All those who are fighting must recognize that there is no military solution."

- Vietnam

On 22 September 2012, Vietnamese Foreign Ministry Spokesman Luong Thanh Nghi calls for "concerned parties to abide by the international law and signed agreements, to restrain themselves and keep tensions from escalating while working on resolving disagreements by peaceful negotiations,"

- Yemen

On 21 April 2012, Yemen condemned South Sudan's occupation of Heglig, called for both parties to give diplomatic efforts a chance, and argued both sides should "establish ties enhancing the mutual confidence and building on the bonds of common history and human relations between the two countries."

== See also ==
- Air campaign of the Heglig Crisis
- South Sudan–Sudan relations
- Second Sudanese Civil War
