= Heglig =

Heglig هجلیج (Arabic) Panthou
- Town
- Location in Sudan
- Coordinates: 9°59′58″N 29°23′55″E
- Country: Sudan
- State: West Kordofan

Heglig Airport
- IATA: HEG; ICAO: HSHG

Summary
- Airport type: Public / military
- Serves: Heglig
- Elevation AMSL: 1,327 ft (404 m)

Map
- Location of the airport in Sudan

Runways
Direction	Length		Surface
Direction	ft	m	Surface
16/34		2,000	Gravel
16R/34L		1,500	Gravel

Heglig, or Panthou (also spelled Heglieg or Pandthow), is a small town at the border between the South Kordofan state of Sudan and the Unity State in South Sudan. The entirety of Heglig is claimed by both Sudan and South Sudan, but administered by Sudan. The area was contested during the Second Sudanese Civil War. In mid-April 2012, South Sudan's Sudan People's Liberation Army (SPLA) captured the Heglig oil field from Sudan. Sudan took it back at the Second Battle of Heglig ten days later.

== Etymology ==
Heglig is the Arabic name of the "desert date", the fruit of the Balanites aegyptiaca tree, which is found in most parts of Africa and the Middle East. Sudanese Sufis use heglig (lalob) seeds to make rosaries. Lalob is also a favorite food for camels, goats, sheep and cattle. South Sudan does not recognize the name Heglig for the town. During the 10-day occupation by the SPLA, South Sudan restored the name of the town Panthou, a Dinka translation of the word heglig. Panthou is a combination of two words in Dinka; "Pand" which mean the area or home and "Thou" which is the desert date tree, as such Panthou means land or home of desert's date. There are many places around the Dinka areas that have the name of Panthou.

== Heglig oil field ==
Heglig is situated within the Muglad Basin, a rift basin which contains much of South Sudan's proven oil reserves. The Heglig oil field was first developed in 1996 by Arakis Energy (now part of Talisman Energy). Today it is operated by the Greater Nile Petroleum Operating Company. Production at Heglig is reported to have peaked in 2006 and is now in decline. The Heglig oil field is connected to Khartoum and Port Sudan via the Greater Nile Oil Pipeline.

In July 2009, the international organization, Permanent Court of Arbitration (PCA) redefined the boundaries of Abyei, a county that lies between South Sudan and Sudan. The decision placed the Heglig and Bamboo oilfields out of Abyei boundary but did not specify to be belong to the Sudan province of South Kordofan, nor to Upper Nile region, South Sudan and also the decision did not specify oil sharing. The government of Sudan claimed that area is belong to its country since it was ruled to be out of Abyei boundary by PCA and announced they would not share any oil revenue with the Government of South Sudan, emphasizing that the PCA established that Heglig was part of the north. The document of the PCA only indicated that the Heglig or Panthou area is not part of Abyei.

There was fighting in the area during the 2012 Heglig Crisis, both the First Battle of Heglig and Second Battle of Heglig. In the first battle, South Sudanese forces raided the town and took control of it. In the second battle, Omar al-Bashir, president of Sudan, organized an army to recapture Heglig. The battle was successful and forced South Sudan to withdraw and led to continued clashes along the border.

The Rapid Support Forces seized control over the area on 8 December 2025 during the ongoing Sudanese civil war. On 11 December 2025, the Rapid Support Forces, the Sudanese Armed Forces, and the South Sudan People's Defence Forces signed a tripartite agreement to prevent the conflict from damaging the oil field due to the strategic role it plays in Sudan and South Sudan. The Rapid Support Forces withdrew and the South Sudan People's Defence Forces entered to maintain security as a neutral party.

== Heglig Airport ==
Heglig Airport hosted three Sudanese Air Force helicopter squadrons (Mil Mi-8/Mil Mi-17). The airport's runways are both gravel.

== See also ==
- Economy of South Sudan
- Greater Nile Oil Pipeline
- Muglad Basin
- Biem, South Sudan
