= Bentiu =

Bentiu بانتيو
- City
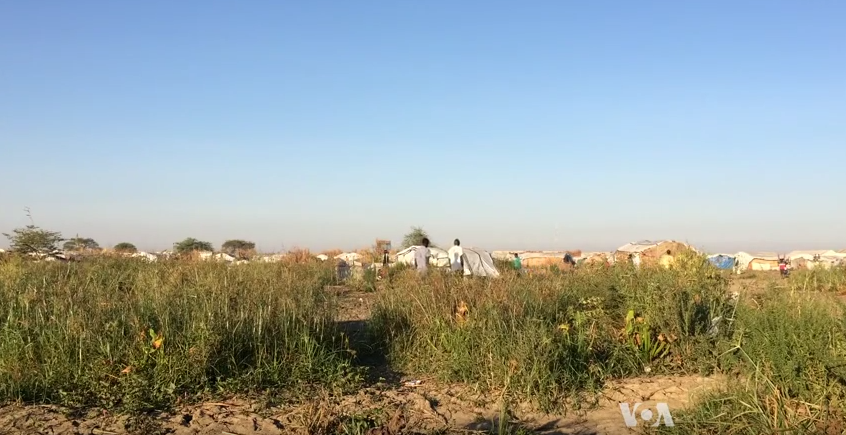
- Part of the UN's refugee camp in Bentiu

- Location in South Sudan
- Coordinates: 9°15′36″N 29°48′00″E
- Country: South Sudan
- Region: Greater Upper Nile
- State: Unity State
- County: Guit County
- Elevation: 347 m (1,138 ft)

Population (2010 est.)
  - Total: 6,508 (plus 120,000 in the surrounding refugee/IDP camp)
- Time zone: UTC+2 (CAT)

Bentiu, also spelled Bantiu, is a city in South Sudan. It is the capital of Unity State.

== Location ==
Bentiu is located in Guit County, Unity State, in the Greater Upper Nile region of South Sudan, near the international border with the Republic of the Sudan. It lies approximately 654 kilometers (406 miles), by road, northwest of Juba, the capital and largest city in the country. Bentiu sits on the southern bank of the Bahr el Ghazal River that separates it from the town of Rubkona, which sits on the river's northern bank. The two towns are joined by the El Salaam Bridge that spans the river. This bridge, along with a market, was bombed and partially damaged by North Sudanese MiG-29 bomber airplanes on April 23, 2012, during the Heglig Crisis. At least three people were killed in the raid.

== Population ==
As of 2006, the population of Bentiu including entire Guit County Payams was estimated at 100,230.

== Overview ==
The town was the administrative, political and commercial center of Unity state before its reorganisation in 2015 into the three new states of Ruweng, Southern Liech, and Northern Liech, and since the state's re-establishment. The state governor maintains the headquarters of the state in the town, however the county headquarters for Rubkona County are situated in the town of Rubkona, across the river.

During the South Sudanese conflict that began in December 2013, the national government lost control of the town to a commander loyal to former vice president Riek Machar, although Machar denied this. Violence in the area continued, and on January 17, 2014, a United Nations official was quoted as saying that the town "simply did not exist anymore", and that "it was completely burnt down". In April 2014, hundreds of Bentiu civilians were massacred by the "Sudan People's Liberation Movement in Opposition Army" led by Machar.

== IDP Camp: United Nations Protection of Civilians Site Bentiu ==
In December 2014, between 40,000 and 50,000 people lived in Bentiu's refugee/IDP camp, located outside the ransacked town of Bentiu, and Doctors Without Borders had begun to provide medical services.

A 2015 survey indicated that Nuer was the preferred language for radio and news in the camp.

By 2016, the camp was considered the largest refugee camp in South Sudan, and over 120,000 people had sought refuge there to escape fighting. Conditions in the camp were especially difficult in the dry season, when temperatures can reach 115 degrees Fahrenheit. Additional wells were drilled to increase the available water supply, with the assistance of the Groundwater Relief charitable organization.

In 2018, a tree nursery pilot project was implemented for the camp, by the International Organization for Migration South Sudan, with support from the USAID Office of U.S. Foreign Disaster Assistance and the European Commission Directorate-General for European Civil Protection and Humanitarian Aid Operations, using "local trees such as mango, guava, neem, dinkipesha, ban, keer, meth, lemon, bannes, powpow, dhuras, chokas, etc."

In November 2018, Doctors without Borders reported that a series of shocking attacks had occurred, against 125 women and girls who were walking to a food distribution center in Bentiu. On December 20, the Government of South Sudan said "claims of sexual attacks on more than 150 women and girls outside Bentiu in Northern Liech State are unfounded and baseless." The United Nations Mission in South Sudan deployed a human rights team to the area to investigate allegations of 150 rapes, added patrols for additional protection, and began clearing brush and vegetation from roadsides to deter attackers.

A 2021 documentary, Voices from Bentiu, portrays the work of Doctors not Borders staff and patients.

The population count at the camp as of October 2023 was fluctuating between roughly 100,000 to 160,000, as people sought refuge from armed conflicts and two years of flooding due to heavy rainfall.

== Economy ==
- The former Unity state is the location of some of the largest oil deposits in South Sudan. The Heglig oil field, to the north of Bentiu, straddles the border between Sudan and South Sudan. The Greater Nile Oil Pipeline begins in Unity oil field in Northern Liech state and extends north into the Republic of the Sudan to the refinery at Port Sudan on the Red Sea. Another oilfield sits near the township of Tarjath, about 60 kilometers (35 miles) to the south of the town. A lot of petroleum-related activity goes on in and around Bentiu.
- Kenya Commercial Bank South Sudan maintains a branch in Bentiu.

== Infrastructure ==
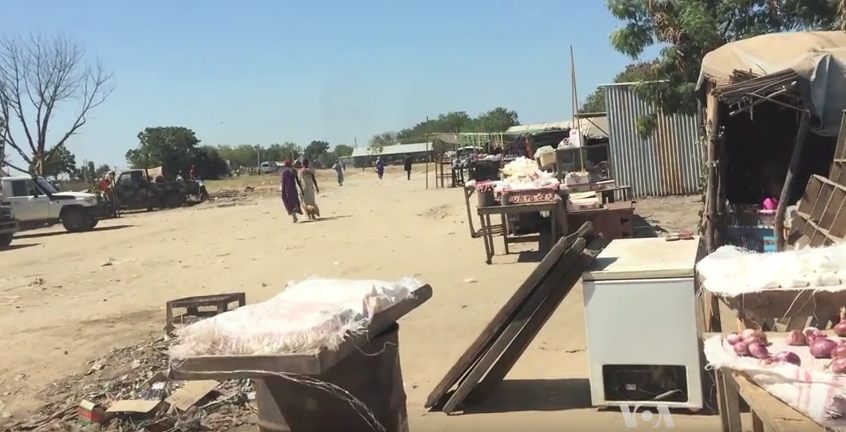
A typical street in Bentiu

After the destruction during the Second Sudanese Civil War, infrastructure in and around Bentiu is now being rebuilt. The projects that have been rehabilitated, constructed, or restored include the following:

1. Bentiu Airport - located just north of Rubkona, opposite Bentiu on the Bahr el Ghazal River
2. Bentiu Civil Hospital - donated and constructed by the China National Petroleum Corporation
3. Bahr el Ghazal River - redredged to allow barges free passage
4. Rubkona New Market - largest source of fresh produce for both towns
5. Bentiu water treatment plant - "rehabilitated and upgraded" in May 2016.

== Education ==
Bentiu is also the location of the planned Western Upper Nile University, a promise by the state's education officials to speed up the higher education system in what was then Unity state. Bentiu has three primary schools and two secondary schools. These schools were teaching in Arabic before 2005, and as of 2011, English is being taught.

== See also ==
- Guit County
- Bentiu Airport
- Unity state
- Greater Upper Nile
- Greater Nile Oil Pipeline
- Greater Nile Petroleum Operating Company
- 2014 Bentiu massacre
