= 2016–2019 Wau clashes =

Armed conflict in Wau, South Sudan

- Part of the South Sudanese Civil War, and the ethnic violence in South Sudan
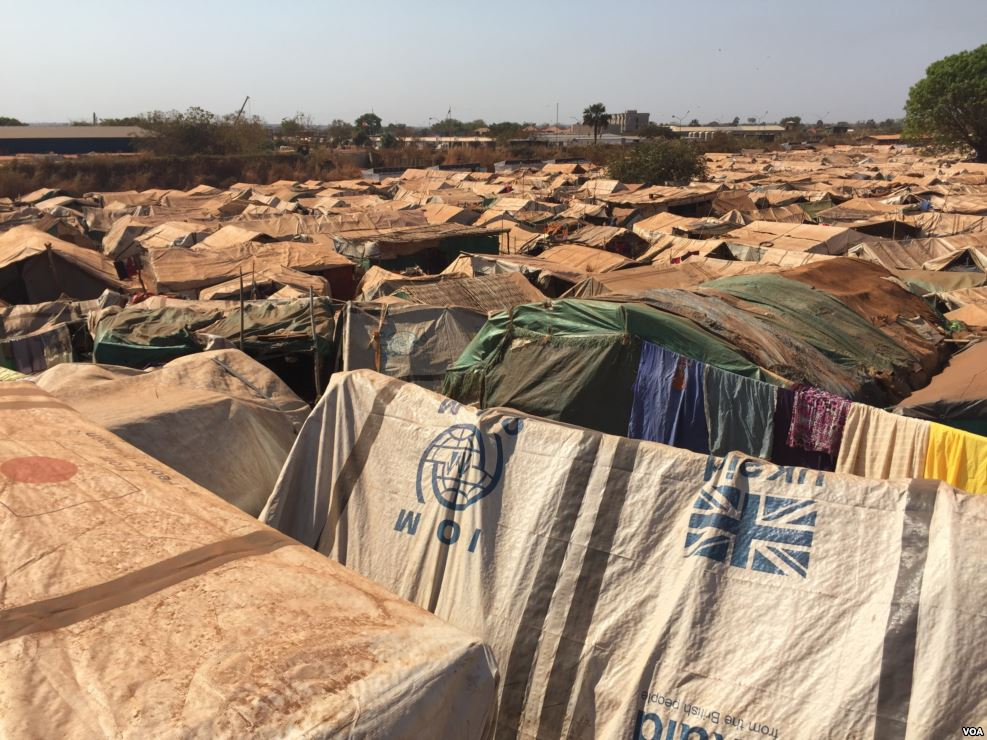
- UN protection of civilians (PoC) site in the town of Wau for refugees who were displaced during the fighting. By December 2016 around 29,000 civilians had found shelter there; by July 2017 this number had swelled to 39,000.
Date	23 June 2016 – 31 January 2019 (2 years, 7 months, 1 week and 1 day)
Location	Wau State, South Sudan
Result	Stalemate; peace agreement: Government secures the town of Wau, and most of Wau State; Rebel forces maintain control of several areas

Belligerents
Local opposition (Note: The SPLM government initially maintained that the insurgents were members of the so-called "Islamic Movement for Liberation of Raja", supported by the Lord's Resistance Army and Sudan, and reportedly led by Ali Tamim Fartak. These claims, however, have been contradicted by several news outlets.): Fertit tribal militias; (South Sudan) SPLM-IO rebels; NAS (since March 2017); Luo tribal militias (since Feb. 2017) (Note: The Luo tribal forces are not in open rebellion against the government, but fight against government-allied Dinka pastoralists.) Aguok and Apuk tribal militias (since Aug. 2017) (Note: The Aguok and Apuk tribes fight against each other over "border disputes, grazing land and water points" in Gogrial State. Their conflict has spread to northern Wau, however, and both groups have raided villages and attacked government soldiers, ignoring state authorities.)	(South Sudan) SPLM government: SPLM-IO (Taban Deng Gai splinter faction); JEM (opposition claim)

Commanders and leaders
(South Sudan) Brig. Gen. Augustine Charles (SPLM-IO commander of Western Bahr el Ghazal) (South Sudan) Maj. Gen. Ashhab Khamis Fahal Ukanda (SPLM-IO commander) (South Sudan) Gissmalla Arnu(SPLM-IO commander) (South Sudan) Peter Tingo (SPLM-IO shadow governor of Wau by June 2016) (South Sudan) Dominic Ukello (SPLM-IO shadow governor of Wau by early 2017) (South Sudan) Col. Nicola Gabriel Adam (SPLM-IO spokesman in Wau) (South Sudan) Gen. Faiz Ismail Fatur (NAS commander of Western Bahr el Ghazal)	(South Sudan) Lt. Gen. Paul Malong Awan (SPLA Chief of General Staff 2016–17) (South Sudan) Lt. Gen. James Ajonga Mawut † (SPLA Chief of General Staff from 2017) (South Sudan) Elias Waya Nyipuoc (POW) (Wau governor until 2016) (South Sudan) Andrea Mayan Achor (Wau governor 2016–17) (South Sudan) Angelo Taban Biajo (Wau governor from 2017) (South Sudan) Lt. Gen. Gabriel Jok Riak (5th Division, 2016) (South Sudan) Maj. Gen. Michael Majur Alier (5th Division, c. 2017/18) (South Sudan) Gen. Stephen Buay Rolnyang (5th Division, c. 2017/18) (South Sudan) Maj. Gen. Keer Kiir Keer (5th Division, 2018–19) (South Sudan) Brig. Gen. Peter Par Jiek † (South Sudan) Mathok Akec † (South Sudan) Col. Abraham Bol Chut Dhuol † (South Sudan) Gen. Magok Magok (South Sudan) Gen. Thayip Gatluak

Units involved
(South Sudan) SPLA-IO: Western Bahar Ghazal Lion Forces (WBGLF)	SPLA: 5th Division; Mathiang Anyoor (Note: "Mathiang Anyoor" is an umbrella term for SPLA troops who mostly belonged to the Dinka people, have been recruited from Northern Bahr el Ghazal's Aweil region, and were traditionally patronized by Paul Malong Awan. Both irregular militias, army units formed from these militias, and new, regular SPLA formations haven been described as "Mathiang Anyoor".); South Sudan Air Force; South Sudan Police Service; Dinka tribal militias

Strength
Several thousand fighters	Several thousand fighters: 1,200 (in Momoi and Abushaka); Several Mil Mi-17s and Mil Mi-24s

Casualties and losses
7,000 defected (gov. claim)	Unknown
- 500+ killed (as of late June 2016); 70,000–150,000 displaced

Armed clashes took in Wau State from late June 2016 to January 2019 between the Dinka-dominated Sudan People's Liberation Army (SPLA) and local opposition forces, consisting of tribal Fertit militias as well as fighters claiming allegiance to Riek Machar. It is unclear to what extent these rebels were actually part of the SPLM-IO or acting independently while using the SPLM-IO's name. The clashes resulted in the arrest of the state's governor, Elias Waya Nyipuoc, widespread death and destruction in the state capital, Wau town, and the displacement of up to 150,000 people.

== Background ==
Rivalries and violence between various ethnic groups have a long history in South Sudan. Many minorities in the country believe that their communities are threatened and marginalized by the Dinka people who have traditionally dominated the administration of southern Sudan. The Fertit are one such minority, and mostly concentrated in areas of former Western Bahr el Ghazal, including Wau State. The animosity between Dinka and Fertit became deeply entrenched during the Second Sudanese Civil War, when the Dinka-dominated Sudan People's Liberation Army (SPLA) waged a rebellion against the Sudanese government. Many Fertit opted to stay loyal to Sudan or remain neutral, as they feared suppression at the hands of the Dinka in an independent South Sudan. The SPLA responded by attacking Fertit as perceived enemies of the rebellion, causing militant Fertit to organize the so-called Army of Peace in self-defense. This militia then became involved in widespread massacres of Dinka from 1986, worsening ethnic relations even further.

=== Increasing violence in Wau State ===
Location of Wau State in South Sudan.

In 2015, the South Sudanese government and the SPLM-IO signed the ARCSS peace deal in an attempt to end the civil war. Both sides used concessions in the agreement to their advantage, however, and the agreement gradually fell apart. Wau State was an area which was affected by the ARCSS. The SPLM-IO mobilized forces in Wau, and then demanded that these rebels were granted cantonment zones and be included in the ARCSS' security provisions. This was unacceptable to Gen. Paul Malong Awan, the SPLA's chief of staff, who responded by mobilizing loyal army elements such as Mathiang Anyoor units. He then circumvented the formal chain of command, and ordered these SPLA troops to crush the opposition by force, even though the peace agreement was still in force. This resulted in growing ethnic tensions in Wau State from early December 2015. The SPLA soldiers deployed to the region for counter-insurgency operations mostly belonged to tribes from Northern Bahr el Ghazal and Warrap, while the local SPLM-IO fighters intensified their operations.

On 2 December, the SPLM-IO reportedly attacked government units at Busseri and Firka, causing the SPLA to send reinforcements to these area, which were in turn ambushed and defeated by the rebels. Three days later, clashes between rebel and government fighters broke out around Bisellia, Bazia, Faraj Allah, Bringi, Mapel, and the Bo River Post. Amid the fighting there were reports that the Ugandan People's Defence Air Force and/or the South Sudan Air Force conducted aerial attacks against both rebel as well as civilian targets using attack helicopters. The UNO consequently criticised the SPLA for breaching the national ceasefire by conducting offensive operations.

At the same time, Human Rights Watch reported that the newly deployed government soldiers, mostly Dinka, began to abuse the local Fertit population, forcing tens of thousands to flee Wau. Many civilians were arrested and then murdered as purported SPLM-IO supporters. Governor Elias Waya Nyipuoc admitted that by 30 May 2016, he had confirmed that at least 100 civilians had been murdered by SPLA soldiers, and had reported the cases to the government. Unable to stop them, he said that the soldiers probably abused the local population because the government had failed to pay or feed them. This caused them to rob what they needed. Waya argued that this behavior was to be expected when the government neglected their military forces. The SPLA leadership, meanwhile, denied that any abuses at the hands of SPLA soldiers had taken place in Wau. In addition to the violence of the SPLA against civilians, no progress was made in the attempts to enforce the ceasefire between the SPLA and local SPLM-IO groups, as the government denied that the SPLM-IO had any presence in the whole Bahr el Ghazal region to which Wau State belongs. As result, no agreement for SPLM-IO cantonment areas in Wau State was reached. On 9 April, the SPLA command even announced that they would launch an offensive in Bahr el Ghazal and Equatoria to destroy all SPLM-IO units in these regions.

At the same time, the SPLA soldiers were accused by the opposition of intensifying their abuses of Fertit civilians, while reportedly working together with local Dinka militants and armed cattle herders in their attacks. The violence in Wau further increased in June, as individual Fertit began to fight back by murdering soldiers, policemen and Dinkas. This in turn caused revenge killings by Dinkas and SPLA against Fertit. In addition, insecurity in the state increased dramatically, as local SPLM-IO and SPLA units ignored the ceasefire and clashed on several occasions at Bagari and Angu Angu. At least 8 SPLA soldiers were killed, while Raga town in the neighbouring Lol State was overrun by rebels for a short time, resulting in the death of several bodyguards of the local governor.

== Clashes ==
=== Battle in Wau town ===
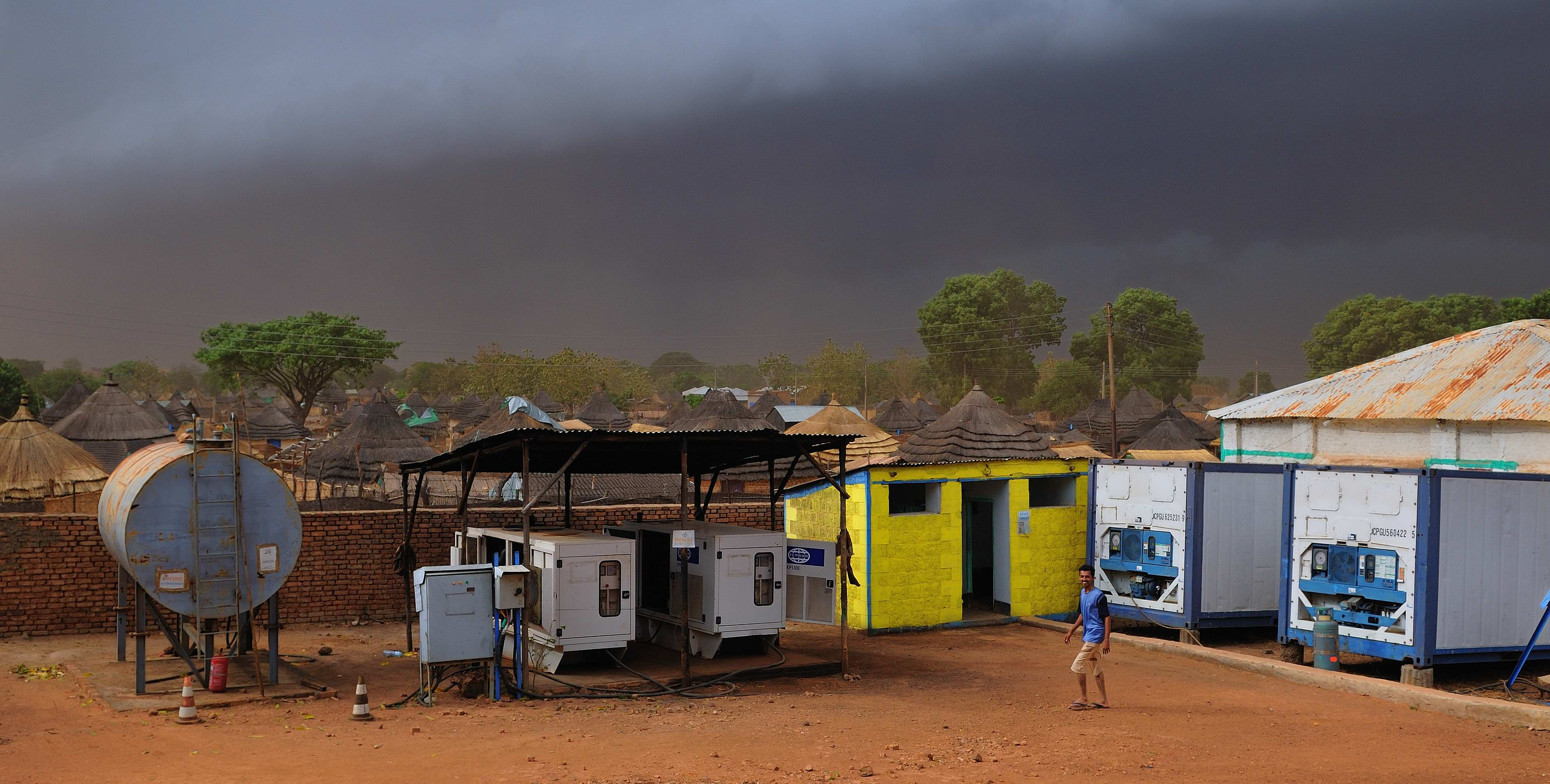
Wau town in 2009

By 23 June, a larger battle south of the state capital, Wau town, broke out between SPLA and SPLM-IO, the latter claiming to fight in order to protect the local Fertit people from attacks by the Dinka-dominated SPLA. As result of the increasing violence, a state of emergency was declared in Wau town, and the SPLA's 5th Division moved in, officially to prevent further escalation of violence. These forces were under the command of Lt. Gen. Gabriel Jok Riak, who had been accused of human rights abuses by the United Nations during the South Sudanese Civil War. Governor Waya initially claimed to support the emergency declaration, stating "All who are here are rebels, so the Division [5 of the] SPLA is ready and even those who are just walking around are ready". However, opposition groups claimed that the army soon began to plunder the state capital, and to assault the civilian population, leading Governor Waya to criticise the soldiers. On 24 June 2016, President Kiir unexpectedly sacked Waya, and just a few hours later, had him arrested. A local SPLA commander declared that Waya had been arrested because he was responsible for the deteriorating situation in the state, claiming that he had no respect for the military and talked "nonsense". A few days later, a document began to circulate on the internet that claimed that Lt. Gen. Mangar Buong Aluenge of the SPLA had plotted from the very beginning to remove and arrest Waya, while the Society for Threatened Peoples believed that Waya's criticism of the army had led to his arrest.

As result of Waya's dismissal, the situation escalated completely, as a heavy battle broke out in Wau town on evening of 24 June. Dinka youth militants in civilian clothing and uniforms entered Wau's south-western neighbourhoods, where they murdered and raped Fertit civilians. According to independent and opposition sources, as army soldiers and Dinka militias intensified their attacks on the town's Fertit population, many locals picked up arms and began to fight the pro-government forces. They were supported by armed Fertit youth from the countryside, who also came into Wau town to take revenge against the Dinkas. The SPLM-IO claimed that their forces had stayed out of Wau town, but attacked SPLA soldiers to protect Fertit civilians in the settlement's southern outskirts. Massacres continued throughout the night, but by late 25 June the SPLA claimed to have secured the town and began to search for hiding insurgents. The army imposed a curfew in Wau town the next day, and, according to local civilians, together with Dinka tribal fighters once again began to kill, rape and rob the local Fertit civilians. These began to flee en masse to the nearby UNMISS base and local churches for protection; others escaped to areas held by SPLM-IO-aligned Fertit militias such as the "Fertit Lions". The government forces, however, maintained that the whole battle was the result of tribal fighters invading the town, whereupon "some greedy civilians started immediately on a looting spree". Accordingly, the army had just defended itself and not preyed on civilians, though army spokesman Lul Rurai Koang said that it was possible that individual soldiers might have participated in the looting.

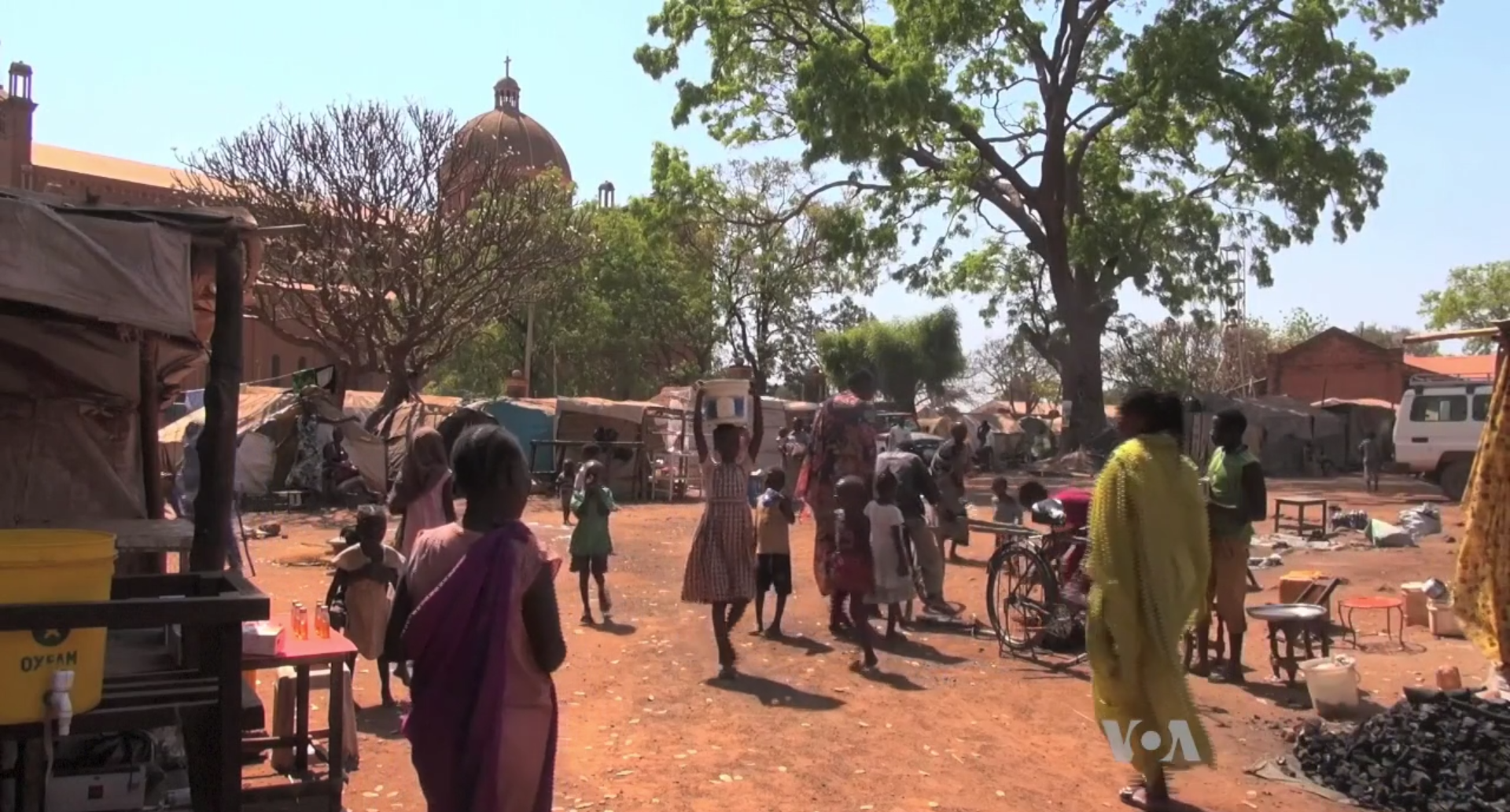
The refugee camp at Wau town's cathedral, where around 8,500 IDPs had found shelter by December 2016.

On 28 June, Wau town was once again attacked by a major force of insurgents, reportedly 350–700 fighters. Independent and opposition sources claim that the assailants belonged to a pro-Fertit, SPLM-IO-linked tribal militia, while the government said they were part of the "Islamic Movement for Liberation of Raja". This group, government spokesman Makuei Lueth further claimed, wanted establish an Islamic state in the region, but also included members of the Christian Lord's Resistance Army. He accused Sudan of backing them. The assault was eventually repelled, and afterwards Dinka gunmen once again began to loot the town and executed anyone opposing them. While the government claimed that the looters were unrelated criminals, locals believed them to be SPLA soldiers as they wore uniforms. UNMISS also said that a total breakdown of law and order had taken place in Wau. A least 30 people were killed while attempting to protect the properties of civilians who fled their homes. After the attackers were driven off, the pro-government mayor of Wau town quickly declared that the town was safe again, but most residents refused to return home. One civilian stated that "Up to now, people are not really secure because some of the soldiers are still moving around."

Meanwhile, the official SPLM-IO leadership attempted to distance itself from the local uprising. It was estimated that the fighting in the Wau State had resulted in over 400 civilians killed, and up to 120,000 displaced. Of these, 12,000 had sought refuge in the local UNMISS base.

On 2 July, the new Governor of Wau, Andrea Mayan, declared that the situation in the state capital had been stabilized, with people being able to return home. A high level committee had been formed to investigate the clashes, and the curfew was lifted. The Guardian, however, reported that by 5 July, only the Dinka-dominated parts of Wau town "were lively. Pick-up trucks mounted with machine guns and full of soldiers toting AK-47s, mostly Dinka, patrolled the area. In contrast, the southern and western parts of town, home to the Fartit, were deserted after people flocked to churches and the UN base for protection."

On 7 July, another battle broke out in Wau town, resulting once again in a civilian mass exodus. By then, it was estimated that 150,000 people had fled Wau town, leaving it mostly deserted. Malaria had broken out among the refugees, most of which were forced to live in the bush. Government and rebel forces blamed each other for the renewed fighting; SPLM-IO Maj. Gen. Ashhab Khamis Fahal Ukanda stated that "They [the government] don't think other people have rights in this country. We all worked together to bring independence of the country. But they have turned against the rest of the people. They think they are born to rule. We will not accept that." Three day later, sporadic, small-scale clashes broke out among SPLA units in Wau town.

=== Fighting in the countryside ===
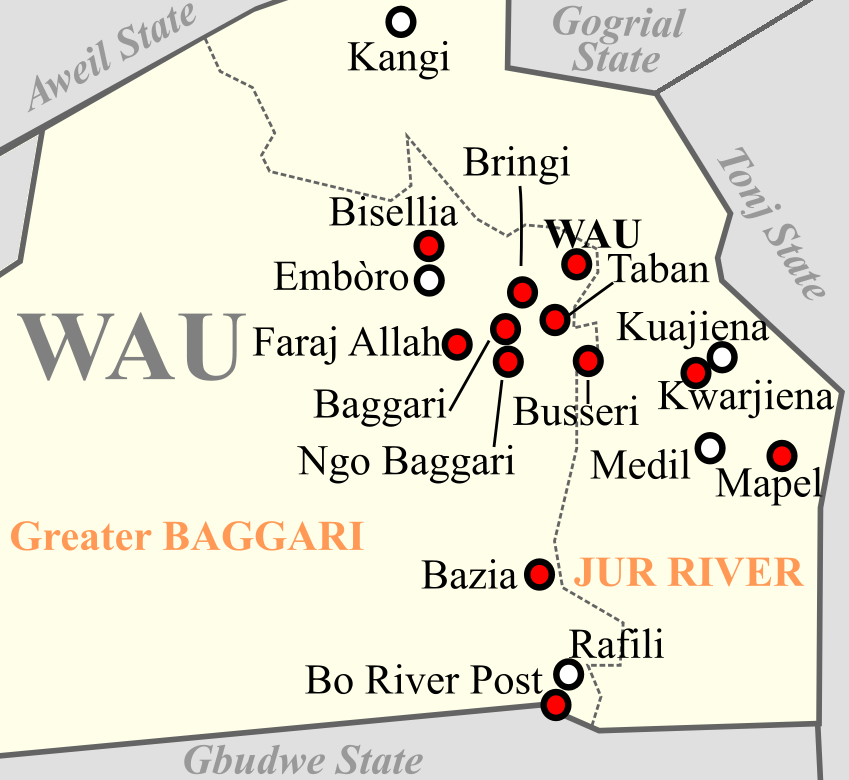
Locations in Wau State where major clashes took place (red) between July 2016 and March 2017.

On 12 July, government forces reportedly launched an offensive against SPLM-IO positions in the whole Wau state, most importantly at Angu Angu, Brenji, Faraj Allah, Bazia and Taban. Heavy fighting also took place in the state capital's direct southern vicinity. While both locals as well as local SPLA commanders confirmed the clashes, army spokesman Lul Ruai denied that any military action took place. Whereas the SPLM-IO claimed that they had attempted to evacuate civilians as they had been attacked, the SPLA's 5th Division accused the rebels of attacking Wau town. Moreover, the SPLA stated that they had relocated most of their forces from the state capital to defensive positions at Lokoloko and Jebel Rabi. After heavy fighting throughout 12 July, the SPLM-IO was forced to withdraw from Angu Angu, Brenji and Taban, accusing the SPLA to have arrested 25 civilians from these sites and to have taken them to Wau town.

Governor Mayan announced on 20 July that he planned to initiate a dialogue with the armed opposition groups that still fought against the SPLA in Wau State. Such peace talks, however, would depend on President Kiir's approval. On 23 July, two SPLA soldiers were executed by a firing squad for the murder of a couple in Wau town. The execution was supposed to serve as warning for SPLA soldiers "who used to violet the military regulation, it is also what tell the people of South Sudan that any soldier found committing crime against civilian should be deal with" said a local judge.

On 27 July, the SPLM-IO captured the Ngo Baggari County in Wau State from the government after fierce clashes, with the rebels claiming that they had captured the local County Commissioner, Anthony Fada Taban. There were also speculations that Taban might have defected to the SPLM-IO. Governor Mayan admitted that the SPLA had indeed abandoned Ngo Baggari County to the SPLM-IO, but said that the retreat was voluntary and that no clashes had taken place. Furthermore, he denied that the County Commissioner had been captured. The SPLM-IO's success in Ngo Baggari was explained by the fact that many locals, who were former soldiers, had been mistreated by the government and subsequently joined the rebels. SPLM-IO commander Ashab Khamis Fahal claimed that 1725 SPLA soldiers had defected to them. Meanwhile, a representative of the UDSF-M party accused SPLA units in Wau State of ignoring the ceasefire and attacking the local opposition groups, thereby causing the insecurity and chaos in the state. He also said that, as the SPLA soldiers received their orders only from the government in Juba, the governor was sidelined and in consequence unable to control the military.

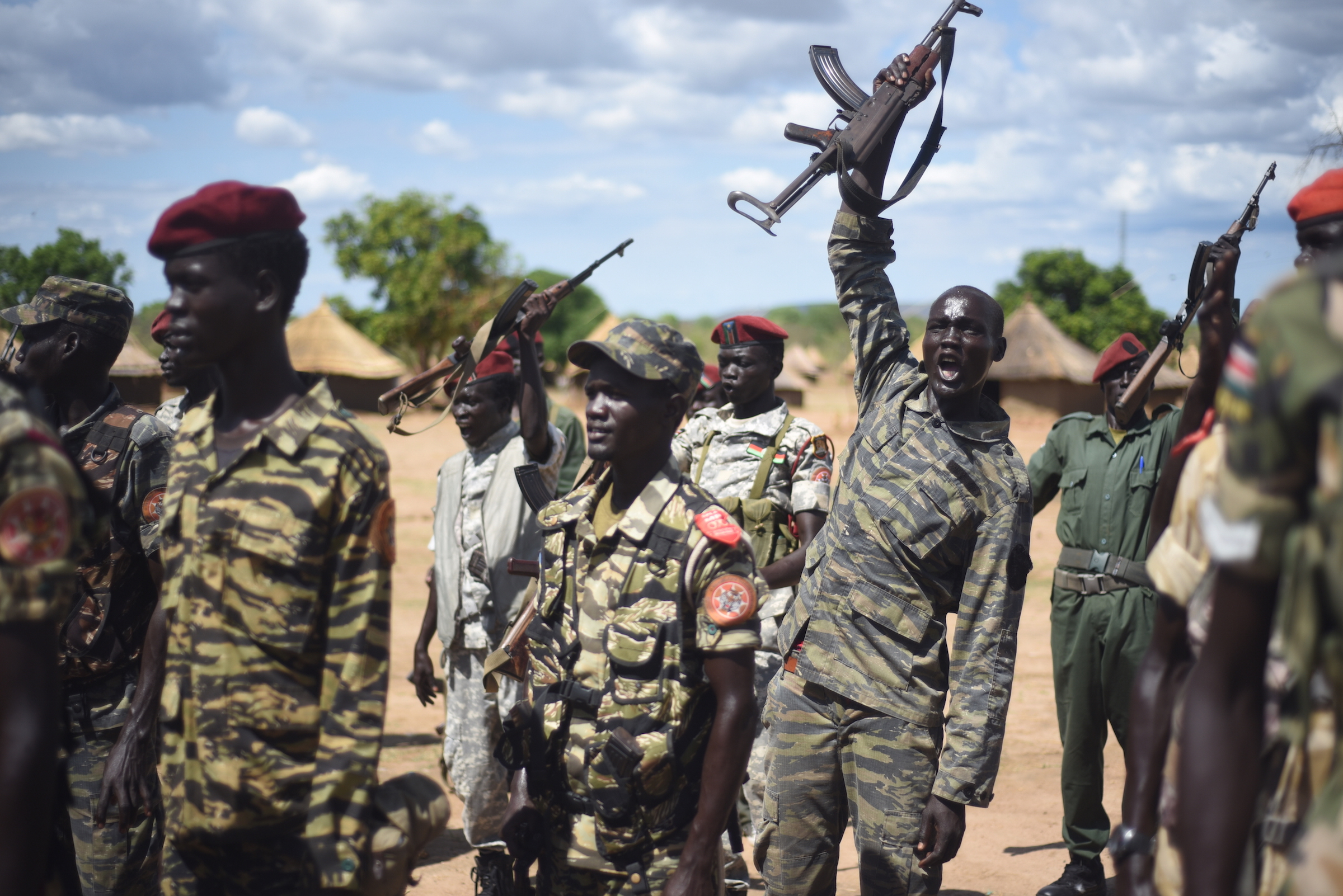
Sudan People's Liberation Army soldiers in 2016.

On 3 August, commissioner Taban resurfaced, announcing that he had actually defected to the rebels, citing the abuse of civilians by the government as reason. At the same time, the OCHA criticized the government's military for hindering humanitarian relief agencies that attempted to enter Wau town. On 6 August, peace talks between the local opposition and the governor were held, though the situation in the state remained volatile, with civilians being displaced or unlawfully arrested by SPLA soldiers. Governor Mayan attempted to ease tensions by negotiating the release of fifty prisoners in October, and including local religious authorities in the peace talks. On the other side, the SPLA prepared a new offensive against the Wau rebels. As of 10 August, the continued fighting had resulted in the Juba-Yambio-Wau road becoming too insecure for the transport of goods, leading to food shortages in Wau town.

On 21 August, President Kiir finally approved governor Mayan's peace talks with the rebels of Wau State, while the governor also reached an agreement with the South Sudan Police Service to deploy policemen to Wau town in order to improve the local security. Between 9 and 11 September, clashes once again broke out west of Wau town, as the SPLM-IO claimed that the peace talks had failed, and the government forces had launched a major attack on their positions. The rebels also said that the attack had been repulsed, though this could not be independently confirmed. On 17 September, clashes took place at Bazia and Busseri. Despite the renewed violence, Governor Mayan declared on 19 September that he had formed a committee to hold direct negotiations with the rebels. Just three days later, the SPLA and allied militias launched another attack against SPLM-IO positions, which led to heavy fighting around Wau town, Baggari, Bringi, Busseri, and Bazia that lasted until 25 September. At the same time, President Kiir finally approved the creation of cantonment sites for SPLM-IO forces in the Bahr el Ghazal region after rejecting this move for a long time. These cantonment sites, however, were meant only for SPLM-IO fighters loyal to Taban Deng Gai, the new Vice President of South Sudan. Riek Machar's followers, on the other side, were referred to as "warmongers" that would "be dealt with" by the government. On 17 October, the SPLM-IO and local citizens accused the SPLA of robbing and killing nine civilians in Wau. At this point, fighting had mostly abated, as the peace talks progressed.

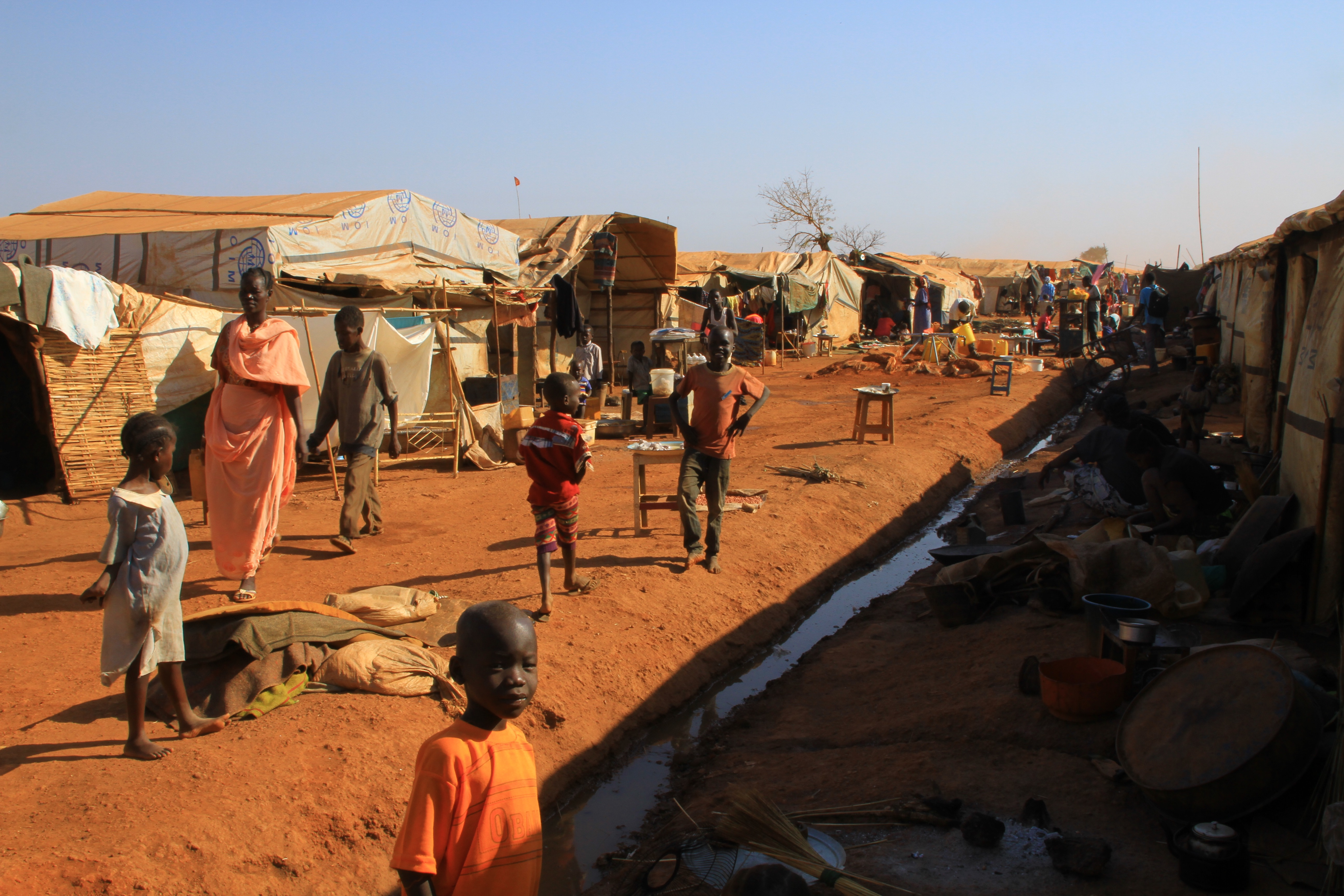
The UN protection of civilians (PoC) site in Wau town in December 2016.

By December 2016, however, fighting had restarted, with the rebels having taken control of large areas in the western part of Wau State. Heavy clashes once again broke out in the area around Busseri, forcing many civilians to flee their homes, with the SPLM-IO claiming to have fully captured Busseri. Even though the governor continued to urge the local rebels to join Taban Deng Gai's faction and end their insurgency, his pleas were rejected by the SPLM-IO spokesman for Wau, Nicola Gabriel Adam. Gabriel claimed that Taban Deng Gai had become part of the government they were fighting, while accusing the army of being the aggressor in this conflict, saying that the SPLA had just recently attacked SPLM-IO forces near Bringi. The mayor of Wau, meanwhile, denied that clashes were still happening, saying the people still fled to Wau town due to food shortages in their home areas.

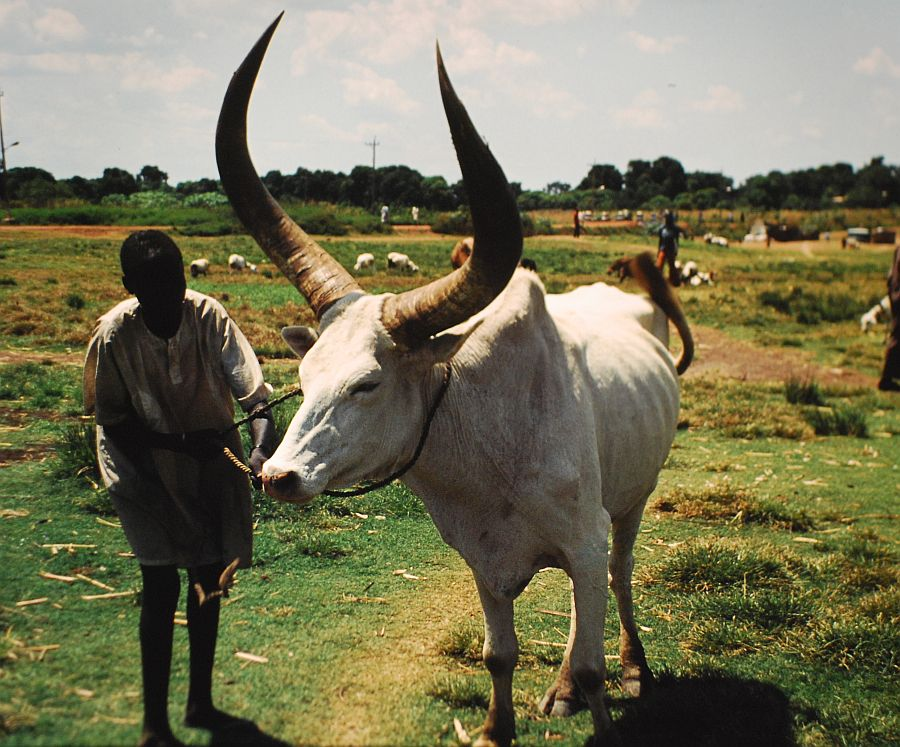
Since February 2017, the conflict between the Luo in Wau State and government-allied Dinka pastoralists from Tonj State escalated, leading to clashes and many deaths over the following months.

By mid-January 2017, about 28,850 IDPs were sheltered at Wau town, unable to return to their homes due to the ongoing fighting. On 20 January, heavy fighting broke out at Khor Natabu along the Bringi-Wau road, as SPLA-allied Dinka pastoralists from Tonj State attacked local opposition-affiliated Luo farmers. The attack was repulsed, and on 25 January the cattle herders retreated to Tonj. Nevertheless, violence between Luo farmers in Wau State and Dinkas from Tonj continued in the following months, leading to clashes that left dozens dead and displaced many others.

Also in January 2017, Lt. Col. al-Fadil Meil Issa, a member of the Ceasefire and Transitional Security Arrangements Monitoring Mechanism (CTSAMM) in Wau, was brutally murdered by unknown assailants. Serving as CTSAMM's liaison officer to contact the local rebel factions, Issa had been loyal to Taban Deng Gai's SPLM-IO faction. When the government consequently arrested four suspects, they declared that Issa had been killed by Machar's followers. Clashes took place directly west of Wau town during the night between 30 and 31 January, when a SPLA patrol encountered a group of rebels by chance. Three government soldiers were killed during the following firefight.

On 9 March 2017, a leading SPLM-IO commander in Wau State, General Faiz Ismail Fatur, announced that he was defecting to the National Salvation Front (NAS), a newly formed rebel group. Ismail blamed his defection on Machar's neglect of the rebels in Western Bahr el Ghazal, and the problems within the SPLM-IO. According to him, the group lacked both a proper vision as well as capable leadership, and suffered from organizational chaos, saying that "the [rebel] army is curtailed by officers without assignments, shamefully, at places, you find a brigadier leading a squad". On 12 March, rebel forces reportedly launched an attack in Kwarjina County in eastern Wau State, causing the army to deploy more forces to area in order to restore security. Meanwhile, Taban Deng Gai's SPLM-IO faction was granted a minister position in the Wau State government as part of a power-sharing deal. Opposition militants launched a major attack on a government base at Natabu west of Wau town on 24 March 2017. In course of the fighting 12 government soldiers were killed and seven wounded, while the rebels suffered two dead and three wounded.

=== Government recapture of Baggari and massacre in Wau town ===
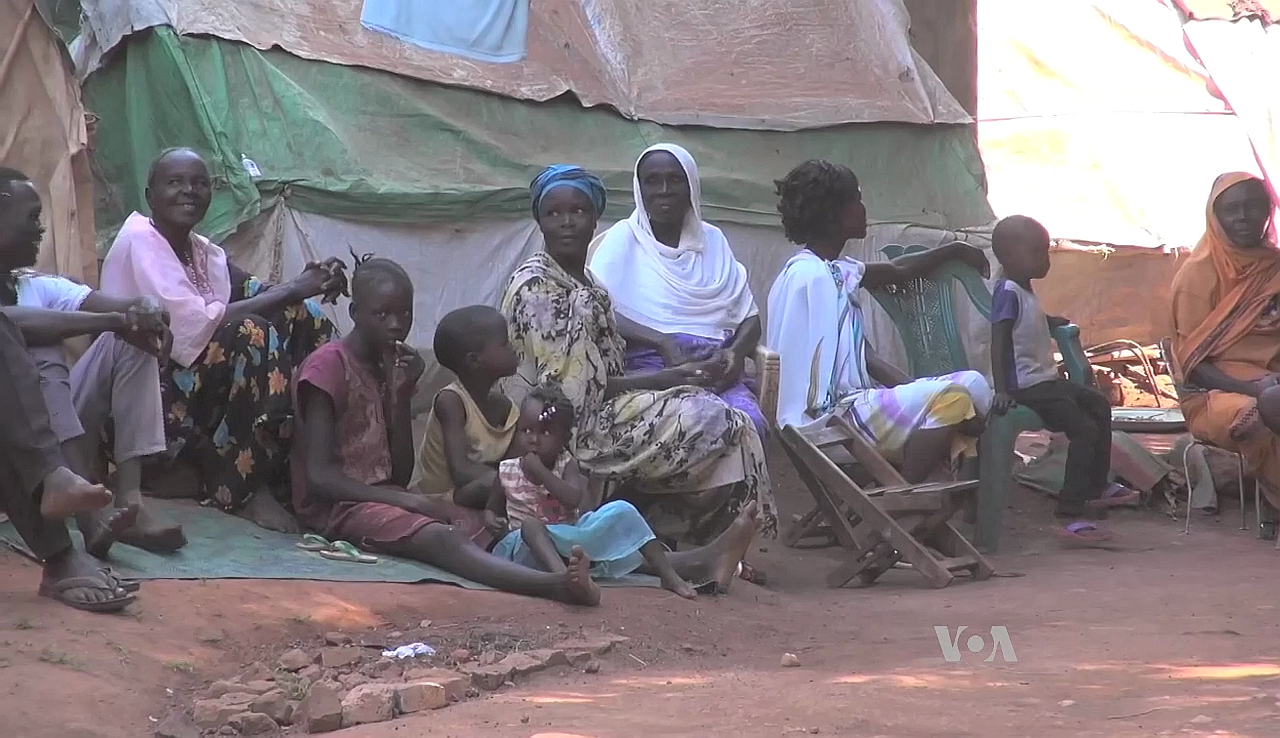
Refugees in Wau town.

The government began to intensify its counter-insurgency operations in Wau State in early April, moving more troops, tanks and equipment into the region. On 4 April, the strengthened SPLA forces initiated a large-scale offensive against SPLM-IO positions in the areas around Bisellia, Baggari, Bazia, and Kuajiena, resulting in fierce fighting. The SPLM-IO later accused the South Sudanese Air Force of having used chemical weapons to bombard them during these clashes. On 5 April, the rebels launched a counter-attack against Mapel, which resulted in a battle during which either government or opposition fighters gunned down dozens of civilians. Three days later, the government forces retook Baggari, which had been in the hands of the SPLM-IO for nine months, after heavy fighting with rebel defenders. On the following day, however, the rebels ambushed a government convoy as it returned to Wau town, and killed Brig. Gen. Peter Par Jiek, Col. Abraham Bol Chut Dhuol (brother of Matur Chut Dhuol) as well as twelve of their bodyguards. In revenge for the ambush, SPLA soldiers and pro-government Dinka militiamen belonging to Mathiang Anyoor began a rampage in Wau town and surrounding villages, murdering and robbing non-Dinkas. UNMISS stated that at least 16 civilians were killed and 10 wounded, while local sources reported 31 killed and 9 wounded. The SPLM-IO and pro-opposition media claimed that about 50 civilians had been murdered. Locals said that those targeted by the pro-government fighters mostly belonged to the Fertit, Luo, Jur Modo/Jur Beli, Balanda Boor/Balanda Bviri ethnic groups, which were believed by the assailants to support the rebels. Due to the renewed violence, 8,000 more locals were displaced, as 4,000 civilians fled to the UN PoC site at Wau town and 3,800 sought refuge at the Catholic Cathedral. The SPLM government, the SPLM-IO, and the National Democratic Movement (another rebel faction) all condemned the massacre in Wau town, with the government ordering the perpetrators' arrest.

It is not a war against rebels, it is a war of looking who is from that tribe and they kill you.

— A refugee at Wau town

On 12 April, the SPLM-IO claimed to have recaptured Baggari and repelled the SPLA attacks against their other strongholds, though this was strongly disputed by the government. As the situation in Wau State and other areas of Western Bahr el Ghazal escalated, SPLA chief of staff Paul Malong Awan was ordered to take command of the operations in the region around 15 April, though Kiir dismissed him in early May. Meanwhile, the number of civilians who had sought refuge at the Catholic Cathedral of Wau town increased to 18.000. In June 2017, Wau State's government organized peace talks between representatives of the Luo tribes of Wau and the Dinka tribes of Tonj with the aim of ending the violence between the two groups. Meanwhile, the citizens of Wau town complained that insecurity still prevailed in the state, with government soldiers regularly stealing from civilians.

=== New tribal conflicts, and famine ===
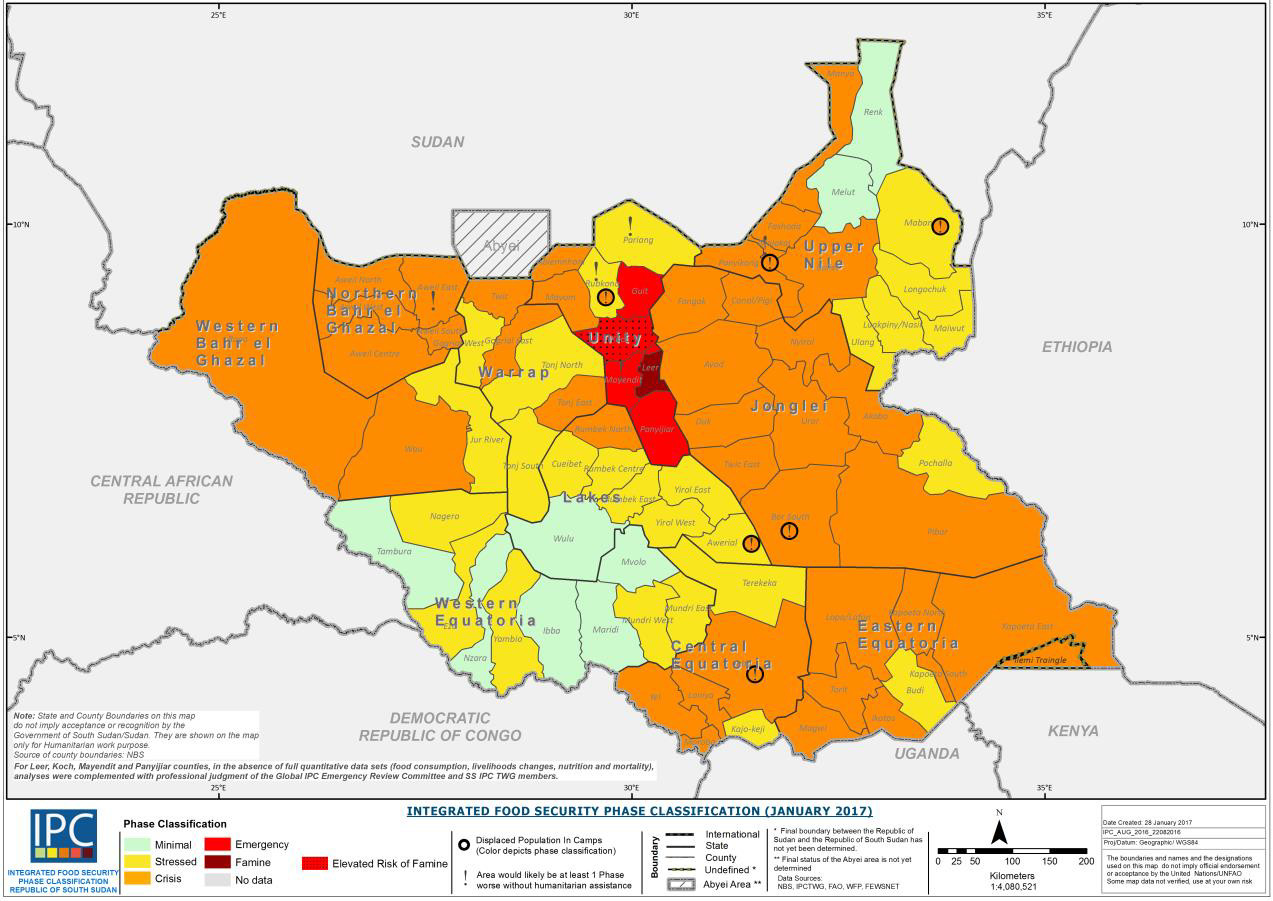
The 2017 South Sudan famine also affected Wau State; the UN rated western Wau per the IPC scale as suffering from an "Acute Food and Livelihood Crisis", while the state's east and north were considered "Borderline Food Insecure".

In July and August 2017, Taban Deng Gai's SPLM-IO faction announced that 7,000 rebel fighters in Wau State had defected from Machar's faction to the pro-government forces; this claim could not be independently verified and was denied by the opposition. Only about 150 rebels, led by lieutenant colonels Santino Akot Majok and Salva Ujok Achor, were confirmed to have surrendered. Fighting in the countryside continued, while ethnic conflicts spread to northern Wau State, where tribal fighters from Gogrial State destroyed a village. On 3 August, the newly appointed operations commander of the government forces in Wau, Mathok Akec, died of food poisoning, though this was disputed by a local doctor, according to whom sigmoid colon volvulus was the actual cause of death. Due to differing from the military's official account, the doctor in question was subsequently arrested, although the civilian authorities attempted to get him set free.

Meanwhile, famine spread in Wau State's countryside, leading to starvation and more refugees fleeing to Wau town, whose IDP population had increased to about 52,000 by July. The reasons for the worsening famine in the countryside, especially in Bisselia County, are disputed: Whereas the government maintained that the security situation in Wau State had improved and blamed the lack of humanitarian support, the opposition argued that the famine was part of a deliberate government strategy to starve dissidents in the Baggari, Bisselia, Kpaile, Kawajina, and Udici Counties into submission by disturbing farmers and hindering the work of NGOs. According to the pro-government commissioner of Bisselia County, Francis Ibrahim, President Kiir had donated 3,400 sacks of sorghum to the refugees in Wau town, whereas Bisselia's population still had not received any aid by the central authorities by 22 August. The food situation in Bisselia improved in September, as farmers were able to harvest their crops; in other parts of the countryside, however, the famine continued unabated. Around 150 people fled from Bazia to Agok near Wau town due to lack of food in their home areas. Nevertheless, United Nations authorities said that the security had markedly improved in Wau State, citing that around 6,000 IDPs had returned from Wau town to their home areas. Around 32,500 refugees still resided in the PoC camps.

Meanwhile, the conflict between tribal fighters from northern Wau, southern Gogrial, and western Tonj continued, as several villages were raided and tribal forces clashed with government soldiers. Wau's governor accused "former state officials" of inciting the tribal militias. On 15 September, President Kiir fired Andrea Mayan Achor and some other officials in Wau State without providing a reason, and subsequently appointed Angelo Taban Biajo as new governor of Wau. Achor said that his removal was a "normal government procedure", and asked the citizens of Wau State to support his successor. In response to the tribal violence in the northern parts of Wau State, the government started an initiative to collect firearms from the civilian population in August, reportedly collecting over 500 weapons by early December. Despite this, armed cattle raids and tribal clashes continued along the border in 2018, with at least 25 people being killed in February and March of that year in the area of Kwarjiena.

In a continued attempt to end the insurgency, SPLA Chief of General Staff James Ajonga Mawut ordered the release of nine POWs who had served as officers for Machar's rebel forces in November 2017, with governor Angelo Taban urging the released officers to encourage active rebel fighters in Wau State to surrender. In December, an important road between Wau and Tumbura could be reopened due to the improving security situation, while the military reportedly prepared a new offensive against rebel forces in Wau State.

=== Paul Malong Awan's rebellion, renewed clashes, and ceasefire deal ===
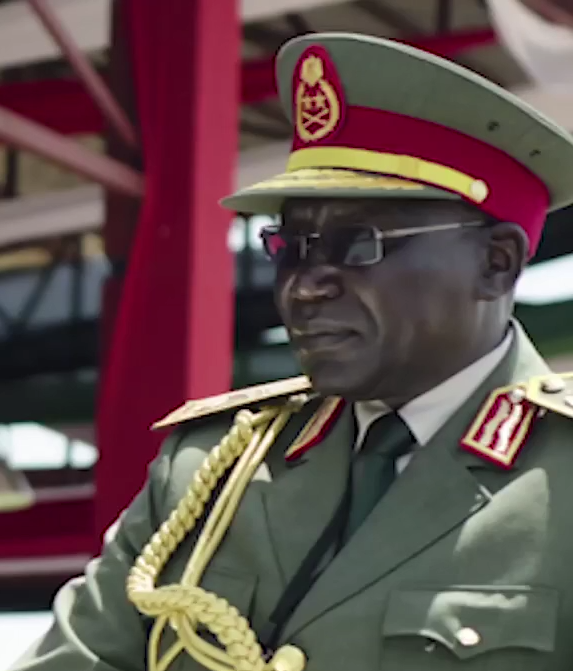
Paul Malong Awan, former SPLA army chief, reportedly planned an attack on Wau in early 2018

In January 2018, it was discovered that former SPLA Chief of General Staff Paul Malong Awan planned his own rebellion against the government, and had begun to organize an attack of associates on Wau airport. The plot failed, and members of the 5th Division who were suspected of being allied with Malong were arrested, while the rest of the division remained alert in case of further possible incidents. Governor Angelo Taban Biajo subsequently declared that there was no further security risks in Wau. Despite initially denying his involvement in any plan to attack Wau, Malong later openly rebelled and started a new insurgent group, the "South Sudan United Front" (SS-UF). In the following months, several officers of the 5th Division joined the insurgency against the government. One of them, Captain Baak Bol Baak, was an alleged Malong follower and escaped with his troops from Wau to join the South Sudan Patriotic Army rebels in Northern Bahr el Ghazal in February 2018. Another, Stephen Buay Rolnyang, was the former chief commander of the 5th Division and rebelled in Mayom in May 2018. Major General Keer Kiir Keer was appointed new head of the SPLA's 5th Division.

Meanwhile, the security situation in Wau State had improved, so that about 14,000 displaced people returned to their homes between January and June 2018; nevertheless, about 30,000 remained at the refugee camps. Much of western Wau State remained in rebel hands, and the political situation there remained tense; areas like the greater Baggari sub-area were mostly cut off from humanitarian aid and were thus threatened by famine. The Juba-based CTSAMM monitoring group also accused one SPLM-IO group which operated northwest of Wau town of having recruited child soldiers; the SPLM-IO consequently stated that this faction had possibly "gone rogue".

In June 2018, fighting reportedly resumed between government and rebel forces, as SPLM-IO rebels claimed that the SPLA had started to attack them at Ngo-Baggari. According to Human Rights Watch, the SPLA's 5th Division under Maj. Gen. Keer Kiir Keer began an assault on rebel-held areas south and southwest of Wau as well as the town of Wad Alel from 12 June, probably to regaining territory before a planned ceasefire agreement could come into effect. Wad Alel, a settlement dominated by Luo, was captured and mostly destroyed by the SPLA, although the rebel continued to maintain an underground presence in the town. The military reportedly overran rebel positions at Baggari, Bisellia, and Engo halima on 23 June, though the rebels managed to regain these areas in course of a counter-attack on the following day. On 25 June, the SPLM-IO insurgents claimed that the SPLA and allied JEM militiamen had attempted to capture Omboro from them, though the attack was allegedly repulsed. The government denied these accusations, and an army spokesman stated that "there is no fighting because peace talks are ongoing". Although a countrywide ceasefire was supposed to take effect on 30 June, the SPLA reportedly attacked the rebels' base of Mboro in Wau State on that day. The government rejected these accusations, stating that Mboro had been under its control since 2016. A rebel spokesman said about the purported clashes in Wau State that "There is the possibility Salva Kiir is not in control of his forces or he doesn't want peace to come".

The SPLA offensive continued unabated in the next months, resulting in clashes at Baggari, Bringi, Basselia, Mboro, Farajalla, Ngisa, Ngo Dakalla, Wad Alel, and along the Jur River. Tens of thousands of civilians were once again displaced, and there were reports widespread abuses at the hands of both sides. Mboro was captured by the SPLA after a battle lasting from 24 to 30 June, whereupon much of the community was destroyed. SPLM-IO rebels retook Wad Alel in July, forcibly recruiting locals and looting the settlement before retreating. According to witnesses, security forces arrested local men belonging to ethnic minorities suspected insurgents, during the offensive. The detainees were transported to facilities at Grinti and Jebel Akhdar, and tortured before being released. Both sides hindered the delivery of humanitarian aid by NGOs. The SPLA offensive ended in late August 2018. In September 2018, the South Sudanese government and Riek Machar's SPLM-IO faction signed a peace deal, resulting in the gradual cessation of hostilities between the two sides. Fighting in Wau State initially continued despite the agreement.

Wau State's SPLM-IO rebels agreed to a ceasefire on 31 January 2019, formally ending their insurgency. Both Brigadier General Peter Ngoli, head of SPLA-IO operations in Besselia region, and SPLA commander Joshua Konyi signalled the readiness of their forces to adhere to the peace deal.

== Aftermath ==
Following the end of the clashes, the security situation in Wau State improved, and the relations between soldiers and civilians became better as well. Confidence-building efforts by the NGOs Saferworld and the Community Empowerment for Progress Organization (CEPO) helped to generate new trust, child soldiers were demobilized, and the military encouraged troops to behave properly. At the same time, locals urged to government to pay its soldiers so that they were not forced to steal to feed their families. President Kiir held a speech in Wau on 5 March, asking the people for forgiveness for the mistakes of his government. He urged the locals to refrain from further violence and revenge attacks. He also stated that the government would try to improve the local roads, and ease tensions between farmers and nomads in Wau State. By this point, most refugees in Wau town had returned to their homes.

Per the peace deal the Machar-loyal forces began to relocate to agreed assembly points in Wau State from 22 May 2019, when the first rebel battalion arrived at Busseri.

By late 2019, a substantial number of SPLA soldiers stationed around Wau belonged to Mathiang Anyoor units. As non-native Dinka, they had few options to defect or desert, and were thus regarded as loyal to the government.
