= Stephen Buay Rolnyang =

South Sudanese rebel leader of SSPM/A and former SSPDF general

- Born: 15 November 1968 (age 57); Tuocloka, Mayom County, Sudan (Now South Sudan)
- Military career
- Allegiance: Anyanya II (1982-1984); SPLA (1984-2021); SSPM/A (2021-present)
- Rank: Major General (until 2019)
- Conflicts: Second Sudanese Civil War; South Sudanese Civil War: 2016–2019 Wau clashes

Stephen Buay Rolnyang (born 15 November 1968) is a South Sudanese rebel leader of SSPM/A and former SSPDF general. He founded the SPLA elite force in 2006. Rolnyang belongs to Nuer.

== Early life and education ==
Born in Tuocloka in November 1968, Rolnyang enrolled in Ajakwach Primary School in Bahr-el-Ghazal and Wangkei Primary School. He then continued his high school education in Khartoum North. Later, he studied at St. Augustine Seminary and Cambridge International College in Juba, where he earned a certificate in Human Resources Management. Rolnyang pursued higher education at Kyambogo University in 2009 and graduated in 2014 with a Bachelor of Science degree in management science.

== Military career ==
=== 1982 - 2011 ===
Rolnyang began his military career by joining Anyanya II in May 1982. Later, he left the group and joined SPLA. In 1986, Rolnyang earned the rank of Second lieutenant while working as a radio operator. He became an officer of SPLA's general intelligence service from 1991 until 1997. Afterward, Rolnyang was sent to the western Upper Nile and Bahr-el-Ghazal border to serve as the SPLA's third front acting chief of operations.

In 2002, Rolnyang was appointed the SPLA's third front Chief of Logistics. The same year, he was assigned as the SPLA's Western Upper Nile Command Chief of Administration until 2003. He then became the commander of the SPLA mobile force in Kapoeta, Torit, and Magwi in 2006 and 2007.

Rolnyang established SPLA special forces, whose 3500 personnel were recruited from the New Crush Military Training Ground. By the end of 2008, he served as the commander of SPLA police and special forces.

=== 2011 - 2018 ===
Rolnyang served as the commander of the SPLA First Infantry Division in Renk in 2013. One year later, he was mutated and became the SPLA 4th Infantry Division Commander in Benitu. Later, Rolnyang served as the Director-General of Procurement at the Ministry of Defense and Veterans Affairs. He guarded the oil fields during the South Sudanese Civil War.

On 18 May 2016, along with Joseph Manyuat Manydhol, Rolnyang was arrested because they disobeyed the Governor of Unity State's order to break the ceasefire and August Peace Agreement. In 2017, he was reassigned to the SPLA 4th Infantry Division Commander. He then served as the commander of the 5th Infantry Division in Wau in 2018; at the time, Wau was the site of violent unrest.

=== Dismissal ===
Rolnyang visited his family in Mayom in May 2018. However, as he arrived at Mayom, his presence caused tension for Matthew Puljang, SSPDF Special Forces Commander in Mayom, eventually leading to the clash between Rolnyang and Puljang's forces.

Puljang seized Rolnyang in Mayom on 31 May 2018 and sent him to Juba. He was trialed on 4 February 2019 under the charges of treason, rebellion, offenses during operations, disobedience of lawful orders, and violations of standing orders. He denied those accusations and pleaded not guilty. Furthermore, he claimed that military and community leaders who had issues with him created bogus charges.

Rolnyang's personal lawyer, Philip Anyang, pleaded to Kiir to solve the cases due to his poor health condition. Nevertheless, the military court found him guilty, and he was demoted from general to private, dismissed from SSPDF, and jailed for one year in August 2019. Subsequently, he planned to pursue a postgraduate degree in Peace and Security Studies at the University of Juba.

== Rebellion ==
In May 2021, Rolnyang joined SSUF/A under the command of Paul Malong Awan because of the government forces' attack on the cattle camp in his village and the poor SSPDF condition. However, he left the group in August 2021 and formed SSPM/A due to the SSUF/A participation in negotiation talks with the government. As the SSPM/A leader, he ordered the group to attack Mayom town to retaliate against the SSPDF attack towards SSPM/A based in Bong. In October 2022, he proposed the rebel alliance with Paul Malong Awan, Thomas Cirilo, and Simon Gatwech Dual in Equatoria, Upper Nile, and Bahr-el-Ghazal Regions.

In January 2024, SSPDF claimed that Rolnyang cooperated with RSF to plan the attack on the oil fields in South Sudan. However, he denied that accusation.
