= Mayom =

Mayom may refer to:

- Mayom, South Sudan, a town in Unity State, South Sudan
- Mayom County, an administrative region in Unity State, South Sudan
- Máyom, the Thai language name for Phyllanthus acidus
