= SPDF =

SPDF may refer to:

- Seychelles People's Defence Force, the military of Seychelles
- Strategic Plans Division Force, the Pakistan Armed Forces' paramilitary force responsible for protection of special nuclear materials
- Sudan People's Defense Forces/Democratic Front, a militia in South Sudan
