= Saeed Lom =

Sudanese police chief

General Saeed Chawul Lom is a South Sudanese police chief who was Inspector General of the police. Lom was appointed in 2017 by a presidential decree issued by President Salva Kiir following the sacking of General Makur Marol Adout. Lom served 11 months as the head of South Sudan police before his removal from office by a presidential decree. Lom had served as commissioner of police in the newly created Jubek State. Prior to the creation of the state of South Sudan, Lom worked in Khartoum for several years where he was dismissed three times for breach of police work ethics and conflict of interest. He was reinstated into the South Sudan police services along with other dismissed generals during the Comprehensive Peace Agreement (CPA).
