= Peter Par Jiek =

South Sudanese revolutionary (1950s-2017)

- Born: 1950s
- Died: 9 April 2017; Near Wau, South Sudan
- Military career
- Allegiance: SPLA (c. 1985–1991); SPLA-Nasir (1991–1993); SPLA-United (1993–1994); SSIM/A (1994–1997); SSDF (1997–2000); SPDF (2000–2002); SPLA (2002–2017); South Sudan (2011–2017)
- Branch: Sudan People's Liberation Army
- Service years: c. 1985–2017
- Rank: Brigadier general
- Conflicts: Second Sudanese Civil War: Battle of Leer; War of the Peters; Lord's Resistance Army insurgency South Sudanese Civil War: 2014 Bentiu massacre; 2016–2019 Wau clashes †

Peter Par Jiek (Note: Alternatively transliterated Peter Paar Jiek or Peter Paar Yak.) (1950s – 9 April 2017) was a brigadier general of the Sudan People's Liberation Army (SPLA), and veteran of the Second Sudanese Civil War. In the course of that conflict, Par fought under Riek Machar with several rebel and pro-government groups, and eventually became a powerful militia commander in Unity State. In that region, he established his own fiefdom and gained some notoriety for his rivalry with another rebel leader, Peter Gadet. Even though he had followed Machar during the whole Second Sudanese Civil War until 2005, Par sided with President Salva Kiir upon the outbreak of the South Sudanese Civil War in 2013. Leading pro-government counter-insurgency forces in Wau State since 2014, Par was eventually ambushed and killed by SPLM-IO rebels loyal to Machar in 2017.

== Biography ==
=== Second Sudanese Civil War ===
==== Initial rebellion and rise in ranks ====
"You can't fool us [with your denials of involvement]! We were trained by your hand and know your methods"

— Peter Par Jiek to a Sudanese Armed Forces officer about the Leer clashes

Peter Par Jiek was born in the 1950s as a member of the Dok subgroup of the Nuer people. He attended the Malakal secondary school where he received his high school education. After the outbreak of the Second Sudanese Civil War, he joined the SPLA. In 1991, however, Par followed Riek Machar as he broke away from the SPLA, and afterwards served in Machar's various rebel groups, such as the SPLA-Nasir, SPLA-United, and SSIM/A. Eventually, Machar and Par joined the SSDF in 1997, an alliance of militias that had decided to side (for the time being) with the Sudanese government against other rebel factions. This alliance gradually broke down, as its member groups resumed attacking each other. The pro-government force of Paulino Matip Nhial repeatedly attacked the town of Leer in late 1998 which was held by SSDF fighters under Par and Tito Biel. They regarded the assaults as betrayal by the Sudanese government. A military commission was sent to investigate, and claimed that Matip had acted on his own. This did little to reduce Par's suspicion that the attack had been part of the government divide and rule strategy. In the next months, open warfare broke out between SSDF militias and the Sudanese Armed Forces in Unity State. Par took part in the fighting, serving under Biel from 1998 to 1999.

In May 1999, a major government offensive defeated the rebellious SSDF forces, recapturing Leer and driving the SSDF mostly from Unity State. While most of the SSDF retreated to Nyal, Par and some of his men instead moved to Tonj in Bahr el Ghazal. Machar then ordered Par to participate in the Wunlit talks with the SPLA, where he was supposed to ask the SPLA for assistance against the government; the SPLA did send limited aid, and the SSDF consequently was able to regain some ground.

In early 2000, Machar left the SSDF, forming the SPDF, and Par yet again followed him. In March of that year, he was appointed the SPDF's overall commander for Unity State by Machar. In this position, he expanded his forces by recruiting Dok Nuer, who generally supported him. From March 2000 onwards, the allied forces of Par and the SPLA, under Peter Gadet's command, gained some ground against the Sudanese army and Paulino Matip Nhial's militia, while continuing to weaken the government's grip on the area by ambushing military convoies and destroying oil pipelines.

==== War of the Peters ====
Frontlines in June 2001; SPDF territory (including Par's) in green.

The cooperation between Peter Par and Peter Gadet broke down in June–July 2000, as their militias began to fight each other. Who was responsible for the outbreak of hostilities is unknown, as both sides blamed each other. The resulting conflict became known as "War of the Peters". As Par and Gadet battled for control over Unity State, the former was reportedly backed by the government, receiving ammunition from Matip's men. In return, Par's men guarded government installations, especially Block 5A. Between July and August 2000, Par joined forces with Matip's pro-government militia and drove Gadet's men to the west of the Jur River, though Gadet was able to retake all lost territory in August and September 2000. This fighting was brutal and led to enormous destruction and the displacement of up to 60,000 people.

The War of the Peters continued until August 2001, when Par and Gadet agreed to a ceasefire. A few months later, Machar also came to an understanding with the SPLA leadership and agreed to merge the SPDF with the SPLA, whereupon Par and Gadet signed a final peace agreement in Koch in February 2002. As result, Par rejoined the SPLA.

==== Later civil war and LRA insurgency ====
As their dispute was now settled, Par and Gadet concentrated on evicting the government from Upper Nile, though the government soon launched a counter-offensive in the area. While Par managed to repulse an attempt of pro-government forces to capture Leer in September 2002, the Sudanese army eventually retook the town in January 2003 in a fresh drive to clear the area for oil exploitation. The civil war eventually ended with the Comprehensive Peace Agreement in 2005. Thereafter, Par was appointed lieutenant colonel of the SPLA, and took part in the campaign against the Lord's Resistance Army. By 2006, he and his men were stationed in Owiny Ki-Bul in Eastern Equatoria.

=== South Sudanese Civil War ===
After South Sudan's independence in 2011, Par was appointed brigadier general. When the civil war between Kiir and Machar broke out in 2013, Par decided to side with Kiir, and quickly became one of the government's leading counter-insurgency commanders. He narrowly escaped death in 2014, when rebels captured Bentiu and massacred all local government supporters. Afterwards, Par joined the SPLA's 5th Division in Wau State, where he was accused of ordering the killings of Nuer SPLA soldiers in Wau town and Mapel who were suspected of sympathizing with Machar. Since the outbreak of a widespread rebellion in Wau State in 2016, Par was heavily involved in fighting the local insurgents and became the leading commander for all SPLA operations in Wau State.

In April 2017, Par led a major government offensive aimed at retaking Baggari, an important town in Wau State held by SPLM-IO forces. Though his men defeated the rebels and captured Baggari, his convoy was ambushed as it returned to Wau town on 9 April 2017. Par, along with Colonel Abraham Bol Chut Dhuol and twelve of their bodyguards, were killed in the following shootout. In revenge for their deaths, SPLA soldiers and pro-government Dinka militiamen belonging to Mathiang Anyoor murdered and robbed non-Dinkas in Wau town and surrounding villages.
