= South Sudan People's Movement/Army =

- Leader: Stephen Buay Rolnyang
- Spokesperson: Mahafis Mayang Hoth
- Dates active: 2021-present
- Headquarters: Dajo, Upper Nile Region
- Active regions: South Sudan
- Website: South Sudan People's Movement/Army on Facebook

South Sudan People's Movement/Army (SSPM/A) is a South Sudan opposition movement founded on 1 May 2021. In 2023, the group operated along the South Sudan-Sudan border in Upper Nile and Unity State.

== History ==
Stephen Buay Rolnyang founded SSPM/A in August 2021 after leaving SSUF/A. SSPM/A invaded Mayom on 22 July 2022 in retaliation for the government forces' attack on its bases in Bong on the previous day. During the attack, they killed the county's commissioner, Chuol Gatluak, and his three bodyguards. Furthermore, the group burned Gatluak's body. They briefly occupied the town before the retreat to the nearby villages for regrouping

SSPM/A launched an ambush on the SSPDF convoy on 26 July 2022 in Tuoch Loka, Mayoum County, killing 22 soldiers and destroying 3 vehicles. SSPDF executed three SSPM/A military officers in Kaikang on 7 August 2022 after being deported from Sudan allegedly to avenge the previous group attack in Mayom. The execution received condemnation from the UNMISS.

Rolnyang met Simon Gatwech Dual in Khartoum to ally with SPLA-IO Kitgwang on 20 October 2022. Alzool TV reported that SSPM/A forces fought with RSF during the War in Sudan. However, the group denied that allegation. Peter Chuak Wal Banyieng and James Gai Liep Ziel Yiach defected from SPLA-IO Kitgwang and joined SSPM/A with their forces on 14 December 2013 because Gatwech neglected them.
