= Wau State =

State of South Sudan from 2015 to 2020

- State
- Location of Wau State in South Sudan
- Country: South Sudan
- Capital: Wau
- Number of Counties: 11

Government
  - Governor

Population (2014 Estimate)
  - Total: 431,230

Wau State was a state in South Sudan that existed between 2 October 2015 and 22 February 2020. It was located in the Bahr el Ghazal region, and was part of the former state of Western Bahr el Ghazal. Wau State bordered Aweil State, Gbudwe State, Gogrial State, Lol State, and Tonj State.

== History ==
Before Wau state was formed, its territory was part of the former state of Western Bahr el Ghazal. On 2 October 2015, President Salva Kiir issued a decree establishing 28 states in place of the 10 constitutionally established states. The decree established the new states largely along ethnic lines. A number of opposition parties and civil society groups challenged the constitutionality of the decree. Kiir later resolved to take it to parliament for approval as a constitutional amendment. In November the South Sudanese parliament empowered President Kiir to create new states.

Elias Waya Nyipuoc was appointed as the governor for the state on 24 December 2015. After the outbreak of major clashes betweening government forces and Fertit militias in 2016, however, Waya was replaced by Andrea Mayar Achor on the orders of President Kiir. Mayar Acho was sacked in September 2017. He was succeeded by Angelo Taban Biajo as governor.

On 22 February 2020, a peace deal ending the South Sudanese Civil War reverted the 28 states back to the original ten states, with Wau being reincorporated back into Western Bahr el Ghazal.

== Geography ==
Wau State is located in the Bahr el Ghazal region and it borders Aweil to the north, Gogrial to the northeast, Gbudwe to the south, Lol to the west, and Tonj to the east.

== Demographics ==
Wau State is ethnically diverse, as it lies on the tribal border between the Dinka and Fertit peoples, who constitute the region's majority. Furthermore, numerous ethnic minorities live in the state, such as Luo, Jur Modo/Jur Beli, Balanda Boor/Balanda Bviri, Ndogo, Keresh, and Nuer.

As of 2013, ethnic groups reported were Balanda, Azande, Bongo, Gollo, Ndogo, and Bai. Balanda made up the large ethnic group.

== Law and government ==
The capital of Wau State is the city of Wau. The city of Wau is located on the Jur River in the state, and it is the second largest city in the country with an estimated population of 151,320 people in 2008. Wau, South Sudan has its own airport, and the city is located 650 kilometers (404 miles) from Juba, the capital.

=== Administrative divisions ===
After South Sudan was divided into 28 federated states in 2015, the newly constituted Wau State was divided into 8 counties. Each county also received a county commissioner. Later Wau State announced an additional three counties by the Council of States of South Sudan, adding the total number to 11.

- Former Jur River County:
  - Kangi; headquarters: Kangi
  - Kuarjina; headquarters: Kuarjima (Kuajena)
  - Marial Baai; headquarters: Nyin Adok
  - Odechy; headquarters: Odechi (Udici)
  - Roc Roc Dong; headquarters: Roc Roc Dong
  - Wan-Baai; headquarters: unknown
  - Alel-Thony; headquarters: unknown
  - Alur; headquarters: unknown
- Former Wau County:
  - Bagari; headquarters: Bagari
  - Bazia; headquarters: Bazia (Kpaile)
  - Busalia; headquarters: Busalia

== Bibliography ==
- PSI South Sudan; Western Bahr el Ghazal State Ministry of Health; Wau County Health Department; Western Bahr el Ghazal Relief and Rehabilitation Commission (2014). Pre-Harvest Anthropometric and Mortality Survey. Wau County, Western Bahr El Ghazal, South Sudan (PDF). Washington, D.C.: Population Services International.
