= South Sudan Air Force =

Aerial warfare branch of the South Sudan military

- Founded: 24 June 2008; 18 years ago
- Country: South Sudan
- Type: Air force
- Role: Aerial warfare
- Size: 19 aircraft
- Part of: South Sudan People's Defence Forces
- Headquarters: Juba Air Base

Commanders
- Commander-in-Chief: President Salva Kiir
- Commander of the Air Force: James Kong Kong (15 December 2017 – present)

Insignia
- Fin flash

Aircraft flown
- Attack helicopter: Mi-35
- Utility helicopter: AW109, Mi-172, Mi-17V-5
- Transport: An-26, L-410

The South Sudan Air Force (SSAF), also previously known as the Sudan People's Air Force or Sudan People's Liberation Air Force, is the air force of the South Sudan People's Defense Forces (SSPDF) of South Sudan. The headquarters are located in Juba Air Base, Juba.

== History ==
=== Sudan: 2008–2011 ===
On 24 June 2008, the South Sudan Air Force was formally created by the Southern Sudan Legislative Assembly, although it didn't have any aircraft at that time. The U.S. Air Force Special Operations School announced in July 2009 that Sudan participated in the Building Partner Aviation Capacity Course. In May 2010, Major General Kuol Dim Kuol of the Sudan People's Liberation Army said: "SPLA has formed a nucleus air force and navy. Our pilots and engineers have been trained, and local support and administrative units will follow suit."

On 8 August 2010, the South Sudanese government impounded a Mi-8, Mi-17 variant from SudanAir as an effort to stop smuggling of weapons in the South, a few days before delivery of the first SSAF Mi-17s.

British magazine Jane's Defence Weekly said in September 2010 that "Bloomberg News had reported earlier that the fleet consisted of nine Mi-17V-5 transport helicopters and one Mi-172 variant, purchased for a total US$75 million from Russia's Kazan Helicopters, in a contract negotiated in May 2007 for deliveries set to begin in March 2010." The deal was reported to be worth US$75 million; deliveries of the first eight aircraft had taken place by December 2010, with the helicopters delivered to Juba Airport in Antonov An-124 transports, with the remaining two aircraft were delivered in January 2011. Nine of the helicopters were Mi-17V-5s configured for transport, with the remaining aircraft being a Mi-172 configured for VIP transport.

=== South Sudan: 2011–present ===
On 11 January 2011, President Salva Kiir launched the region's air force as the South Sudan Air Force in the presence of senior officials of the Government of Southern Sudan (GoSS) and foreign diplomats. The SPLA purchased its first batch of 10 Mil Mi-17 helicopters from Kazan, a Russian supplier, and ordered unarmed aircraft for transport purposes.

On 13 September 2014, six air force military officers and engineers of the Sudan People's Liberation Army (SPLA) loyal to South Sudanese president Salva Kiir have joined the rebels or SPLM-IO, saying their decision to join the SPLM/A-in Opposition is a result of lack of diversity in the army of training opportunities and poor promotion policy. The deserted SPLA personnel also said that the government of South Sudan used the air force to transport militias and SPLA regular soldiers who participated in the killing of innocent civilians in Juba.

On 25 November 2015, the South Sudanese government launched an aerial campaign on rebel positions in a SPLA-IO's designated area in Mundri County of Western Equatoria State. It was said that the South Sudan Air Force unleashed helicopter gunships and attacked the designated cantonment area of the rebels. The action was a violation of the ceasefire deal and the security arrangements signed by the two parties (GRSS and SPLA-IO).

== Organisation ==
The air force is divided into 2 wings.

- Helicopter Unit
  - Equipped with Mi-17V-5s, Mi-35s and a Mi-172
- Fixed Wing Unit

=== Key dates ===
- June 24, 2008 – South Sudan Air Force formally created.
- February 2010 – first fixed-wing aircraft received – Beech 1900.
- December 2010 – first helicopters received – Mi-17.

== Aircraft and bases ==
=== Current inventory ===
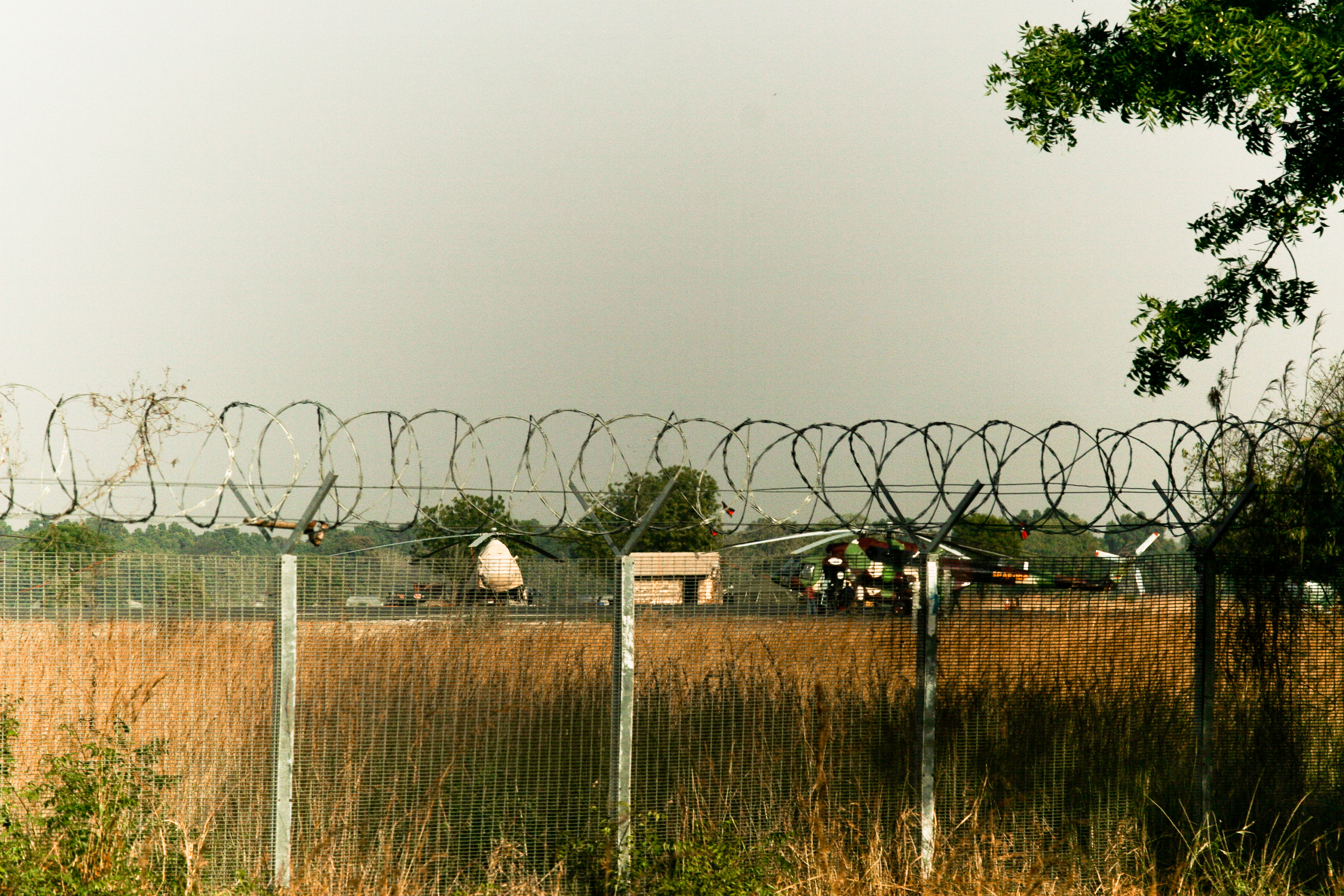
Two SPLA Mi-17 helicopters at Juba Airport

It is difficult to ascertain a list and number of aircraft types operated by the air force of South Sudan because of secrecy.

Aircraft	Origin	Type	Variant	In service	Notes
Transport
Boeing 727	United States	VIP transport		1	
Antonov An-26	Soviet Union	Transport		2	
Let L-410 Turbolet	Czech Republic	Utility aircraft		2	
Helicopters
AgustaWestland AW109	Italy	Utility		2	
Mil Mi-17	Soviet Union	Utility / VIP transport	Mi-172 / Mi-17V-5	7	1 configured for VIP transport
Mil Mi-24	Soviet Union	Attack	Mi-35	6	

==== Aircraft orders 2010-2015 ====
The first aircraft was received in February 2010, and the first helicopters from an initial order of ten were received in December 2010.

==== Retired aircraft ====
Retired aircraft include Beech 1900, L-39 Albatross.

=== Bases ===
Headquarters – Juba Air Base.

== Air Force commanders ==
- 24 May 2017 – 15 December 2017: Charles Lam Chol
- 15 December 2017 – present: James Kong Kong
