= Elias Waya Nyipuoc =

South Sudanese politician

Elias Waya Nyipuoc was the Governor of Wau State, South Sudan from 24 December 2015 until 25 June 2016. He was the first governor of the state, which was created by President Salva Kiir on 2 October 2015.

In late June 2016, insecurity in Wau increased dramatically, as unidentified gunmen emerged who attacked positions in and outside the state. A state of emergency was declared in Wau, as the Sudan People's Liberation Army (SPLA) moved in to prevent a further escalation of violence. Waya himself claimed to support the emergency declaration, stating " All who are here are rebels, so the Division [5 of the] SPLA is ready and even those who are just walking around are ready". On 24 June 2016, President Kiir unexpectedly sacked Nyipuoc, and just a few hours later, had him arrested. A local SPLA commander declared that Waya had been arrested because he was responsible for the deteriorating situation in the state, claiming that he had no respect for the military and talked "nonsense". Shortly thereafter, the situation escalated completely, as a heavy battle broke out in Wau town, the state's capital. By late 25 June, the army claimed to have secured the town and searched for hiding insurgents.

Three days later, however, Wau town was attacked by a major force of insurgence, reportedly 700 fighters, under the "command of [a] dissident South Sudanese politician and joined by other Sudanese militias". Government officials claimed that most assailants belonged to the "Islamic Movement for Liberation of Raja".
