= Sudan People's Defense Forces/Democratic Front =

South Sudanese guerrilla organisation (2000-2002)

Sudan People's Defence Forces
- Leaders: Riek Machar; Peter Par Jiek
- Dates active: 2000 - 2002
- Active regions: Upper Nile
- Wars: Second Sudanese Civil War

The Sudan People's Defense Forces/Democratic Front (SPDF) was an anti-government militia active in Upper Nile from 2000 to 2002.

Riek Machar formed the SPDF mostly from deserters of the pro-Khartoum South Sudan Defence Forces (SSDF) and later merged it with the SPLM/A.
