= Mayom County =

- County
- Location in South Sudan
- Coordinates: 9.224042°N 29.166706°E
- Country: South Sudan
- Region: Greater Upper Nile
- State: Unity State
- Headquarters: Mayom

Government
  - County Commissioner: Col.John Madeng Gatduel Nhial

Area
  - Total: 1,646 sq mi (4,263 km^{2})

Population (2017 estimate)
  - Total: 180,314
  - Density: 109.5/sq mi (42.30/km^{2})
- Time zone: UTC+2 (CAT)

Mayom County is an administrative division of Unity State in the Greater Upper Nile region of South Sudan. It is located to the west of Bentiu. The county headquarters is Mayom town.

== Location ==
Mayom County is in the northwest of Unity State. The largest town is Mayom. Other towns are Tam, Mankien and Wang-kay. Large villages include Rier, Thargana, Buoth, Wicok and Toic. Mayom lies in the Block 4 oil concession to the south of the Kaikang oilfield.

== Civil War ==
Around 1982, encouraged by the Sudan government, Baggara people started to arrive in the Mayom region from the north, armed with automatic rifles. That year the Baggara stole about 500 cattle from the Nuer and Dinka people. The Second Sudanese Civil War began in 1983. In March 1985 there was a fight between Baggara raiders and combined SPLA and Anyanya II forces led by Major Bul Nyawan in which the Baggara were defeated, leading to relative peace between the Baggara and Nuer. In 1987 and 1988 the region was hit by famine due to the conflict between the army, Anyanya 2 and SPLA which had led to villages being burned, mass killings and widespread displacement of people. Mayom was presumably badly hit, but there were no relief agencies to record the progress of the famine.

== Referendum ==
During the Second Sudanese Civil War (1983–2005) many residents of Mayom County had obtained AK-47 automatic rifles, hand grenades and other type of small-arms. In preparation for the January 2011 referendum there was a drive for disarmament. 1,700 guns were handed in to the authorities. County Commissioner Colonel John Madeng Gatduel said this cleared the way for peaceful negotiations between payams (administrative units) that had been engaged in conflict in the past. He noted however that there was a risk of violence spilling over from Warrap State to the east, which had not yet disarmed.

In the January 2011 referendum 98 people voted for unity with Sudan while 80,364 voted for secession.

== Gadet rebellion ==
On 11 April 2011 Major General Peter Gadet Yak, formerly of the SPLA and now of the South Sudan Liberation Army, published the Mayom Declaration. He denounced government by the "current corrupt gangs in Juba" and called for the government of Southern Sudan to be replaced by a national broad-base transitional government. Officials accused the Khartoum government of supporting Gadet's militia and others in an effort to destabilize the country prior to independence. An SPLA spokesperson said the declaration was not written in Mayom but in Khartoum by Sudan Armed Forces intelligence working with the rebels.

In April 2011 there was a clash in Mayom County between Misseriya tribesmen from the north and Sudan People's Liberation Army (SPLA) troops. A Misseriya spokesman denied links to rebel militias in the region, saying "We attacked an SPLA base to return 1,700 cows that the SPLA had stolen from us". According to the spokesman 11 of his tribe died and 22 were injured during the attack. Earlier that month, SPLA troops had fought with Gadet's rebels in a Mayom County village the militia had taken over and then burned, with twenty army troops losing their lives. Following that clash, the Unity state government ordered all north Sudanese workers in the oilfields to leave the state at once.

Later in May 2011 there was fighting between the SPLA and Gadet's rebel militia. The Mayom Commissioner Charles Machieng Kuol reported that 7,800 homes had been burnt down in the Loath, Wanam and Bora bomas, subdivisions of the county, accusing the SPLA of causing the damage. SPLA Major-General Koang Chuol said the damage was caused by cross-fire in the fighting. Charles Machieng was told to apologize for his comments. When he refused, on 30 June 2011 the state governor Taban Deng Gai gave him the sack. Machieng, a son-in-law of the governor, had been appointed in place of John Madeng Gatduel on 7 March 2011. The appointment had been criticized by the Bull Nuer community of Mayom county since they had not been consulted.
