= South Sudan Police Service =

National Police Service
- Common name: South Sudan Police Service
- Abbreviation: SSPS

Agency overview
- Formed: 2009
- Employees: 50,000
- Annual budget: $100m

Jurisdictional structure
- Operations jurisdiction: South Sudan
- Map of South Sudan showing Police jurisdiction
- Area: 644,329 square kilometres (248,777 sq mi)
- Population: 10,561,244
- Legal jurisdiction: South Sudan
- Governing body: Interior
- Constituting instrument: Constitution of South Sudan
- General nature: Civilian police

Operational structure
- Headquarters: Police Headquarters, Buluk, Juba.
- Police Officers: 40,000
- Elected officer responsible: Hon. Angelina Teny, Minister of Interior
- Agency executive: Gen. Atem Marol Biar, Inspector General of Police
- Parent agency: Ministry of Interior
- Departments: List: •Operations; •Administration; •Logistics; •Traffic; •Criminal investigations Division (CID); •Training; •Customs; •Immigration; •Diplomatic Police Unit
- Regions: List: 1.Northern Bahr el Ghazal; 2.Western Bahr el Ghazal; 3.Lakes; 4.Warrap; 5. Western Equatoria; 6.Central Equatoria; 7.Eastern Equatoria; 8. Jonglei; 9. Unity; 10. Upper Nile 11. Abyei Administrative Area 12. Ruweng Administrative Area 13. Pibor Administrative Area

National Police Service (NPS) is the armed national police force in South Sudan.

== Human rights ==
Amnesty International accused it of torture in its 2012 Annual Report.
