= Mayom, South Sudan =

Mayom
- Town
- Location in South Sudan
- Coordinates: 9.224042°N 29.166706°E
- Country: South Sudan
- Region: Greater Upper Nile
- State: Unity State
- County: Mayom County
- Time zone: UTC+2 (CAT)

Mayom is a community in the Mayom County of Unity State, in the Greater Upper Nile region of South Sudan. It is located west of Bentiu. It is the headquarters of Mayom County.

== Location ==
Mayom was a major cattle trading center in Western Upper Nile (now Unity State), in Bul Nuer territory. In peacetime the area around Mayom was sparsely populated by nomadic herders, with about one person per square mile. Mayom lies in the Block 4 oil concession to the south of the Kaikang oilfield.

== Civil war ==
During the Second Sudanese Civil War (1983-2005) Paulino Matiep Nhial became an Anyanya II leader in the Western Upper Nile (now Unity) state, supported by the Sudan Government against the Sudan People's Liberation Army (SPLA). Based in the garrison town of Mayom, Paulino held a strategic position, preventing SPLA from Bahr el Ghazal to the west from attacking the oilfields. In September 1988 Riek Machar's SPLA forces captured Mayom. In cooperation with army officer Omar al Bashir (soon to lead a coup and become President of Sudan) Paulino recaptured Mayom from the SPLA early in 1989. A report on refugees fleeing northward from Mayom and other communities in April 1993 described how they were robbed on their few belongings by Arab militias. One man was killed from trying to keep his remaining money, about US$200.

Mayom was the base for the South Sudan Unity Army (SSUA) that Matiep formed early in 1998, incorporating his former Anyanya II and South Sudan Defense Force (SSDN) Bul Nuer forces. The SSUA was supported by the Government of Sudan. In September 1999 commander Peter Gadet Yak of the SSDN mutinied, going over to the SPLA, and on 29 September shelled Mayom, causing further flight of civilians to Block 5A in the east of the state. A report from 2000 described Mayom as "a decimated village within the Talisman oil concession" and said that the government of Sudan was no longer allowing humanitarian aid flights to land.

== Later events ==
On 11 April 2011 Major General Peter Gadet Yak, formerly of the SPLA and now of the "South Sudan Liberation Army", published the "Mayom Declaration". He denounced government by the "current corrupt gangs in Juba" and called for the government of Southern Sudan to be replaced by a national broad-base transitional government.

On 29 December 2013, Mayom was seized by Nuer White Army militiamen, and the South Sudanese government, led by president Salva Kiir, had attempted to take back the town.

SSPM/A attacked Mayom on 22 July 2022. They killed the county commissioner, Chuol Gatluak Manime, and his bodyguards and burned the commissioner’s office. Later, they withdrew from the town to the nearby villages.

On 30 June 2025, Mayom was recaptured by South Sudanese forces.
