= Deaths in September 2018 =

The following is a list of notable deaths in September 2018.

Entries for each day are listed alphabetically by surname. A typical entry lists information in the following sequence:

- Name, age, country of citizenship at birth, subsequent country of citizenship (if applicable), reason for notability, cause of death (if known), and reference.

== September 2018 ==
=== 1 ===
- Kenneth Bowen, 86, Welsh operatic tenor singer.
- Chen Xian, 98, Chinese politician, director of the National Bureau of Statistics (1974–1981).
- Carl Duering, 95, German-born British actor (Operation Daybreak, A Clockwork Orange, Possession).
- Dorothy Ellis, 82, American blues singer.
- Jim Francisco, 80, American politician.
- Irving Petlin, 83, American artist, liver cancer.
- Freddie Plaskett, 91, British major general and business executive.
- Tarun Sagar, 51, Indian Jain monk, sallekhana.
- Margit Sandemo, 94, Norwegian-Swedish author (The Legend of the Ice People).
- Jean Seitlinger, 93, French politician, lawyer and writer, Deputy (1956–1962, 1973–1997) and MEP (1979–1984).
- Mykola Shytyuk, 64, Ukrainian historian, stabbed.
- Randy Weston, 92, American jazz pianist and composer.
- Ehsan Yarshater, 98, Iranian scholar, director of the Center for Iranian Studies at Columbia University.

=== 2 ===
- Elsa Bloise, 92, Argentine stage actress.
- Clarence Brandley, 66, American janitor wrongly convicted of murder, pneumonia.
- Bill Farley, 73, American Olympic swimmer.
- Jack Henry, 92, American football player and coach.
- Ian Lariba, 23, Filipino Olympic table tennis player (2016), acute myeloid leukemia.
- Cornel Piper, 81, Canadian football player (Winnipeg Blue Bombers), cancer and dementia.
- Kawther Ramzi, 87, Egyptian actress, circulatory collapse.
- Conway Savage, 58, Australian rock keyboardist (Nick Cave and the Bad Seeds), brain tumour.
- Frank Lee Sprague, 60, American guitarist and composer.
- Giovanni Tabacchi, 87, Italian Olympic bobsledder.
- Giovanni Battista Urbani, 94, Italian politician, Mayor of Savona (1957–1958), Senator (1972–1987).
- Claire Wineland, 21, American cystic fibrosis assistance advocate, stroke.
- Fred Zamberletti, 86, American athletic trainer (Minnesota Vikings), spinal osteomyelitis.

=== 3 ===
- Rama Chowdhury, 81, Bangladeshi author, complications from diabetes.
- Lydia Clarke, 95, American actress (The Atomic City) and photographer, complications from pneumonia.
- Juan Costas, 73, Spanish Olympic sailor.
- Klaus Gerwien, 77, German footballer (Eintracht Braunschweig).
- Ian Hampshire, 70, Australian football player and manager (Geelong, Footscray).
- Jalaluddin Haqqani, 78–79, Afghan militant, founder of the Haqqani network.<refDeath of Afghan group's founder unlikely to weaken militants</ref>
- Warren Jones, 74, American judge, Justice of the Idaho Supreme Court (2007–2017), stroke.
- Ju Kyu-chang, 89, North Korean politician, director of nuclear and missile development, pancytopenia.
- Paul Koech, 49, Kenyan long-distance runner, half marathon world champion (1998).
- MJ Long, 79, American architect.
- Jacqueline Pearce, 74, British actress (Blake's 7, Dark Season, Doctor Who), lung cancer.
- Gordon Phillips, 72, English football player (Hayes, Brentford) and manager (Staines Town), cancer.
- Katyna Ranieri, 93, Italian singer and actress (Captain Phantom).
- Thomas Rickman, 78, American screenwriter (Coal Miner's Daughter, Hooper, Truman), cancer.

=== 4 ===
- Joseph Marie Régis Belzile, 87, Canadian-born Chadian Roman Catholic prelate, Bishop of Moundou (1974–1985).
- Marijan Beneš, 67, Bosnian Olympic boxer (1976), European amateur (1973) and pro super welterweight champion (1979–1981), complications from Alzheimer's disease.
- István Bethlen, 72, Hungarian aristocrat and economist, MP (1990–1994).
- Sydney Anicetus Charles, 92, Trinidadian-born Grenadian Roman Catholic prelate, Bishop of Saint George's in Grenada (1974–2002).
- Sheldon S. Cohen, 91, American attorney, Commissioner of Internal Revenue (1965–1969), heart failure.
- Ralph Wolfe Cowan, 86, American portrait artist.
- Bill Daily, 91, American actor (I Dream of Jeannie, The Bob Newhart Show) and game show panelist (Match Game).
- Don Gardner, 87, American rhythm and blues singer ("I Need Your Lovin'").
- Jason Hairston, 47, American football player (San Francisco 49ers, Denver Broncos) and hunting gear salesman, suicide.
- Vladeta Jerotić, 94, Serbian neuropsychiatrist and author.
- Ian Johnston, 71, Australian Olympic coxswain (1960), cancer.
- Christopher Lawford, 63, American actor (Terminator 3: Rise of the Machines, Thirteen Days, All My Children), memoirist and political activist, heart attack.
- Lee Wang-pyo, 64, South Korean professional wrestler and martial artist, gallbladder cancer.
- Ab McDonald, 82, Canadian ice hockey player (Chicago Blackhawks, Montreal Canadiens, St. Louis Blues), cancer.
- Bertrand Osborne, 83, Montserrat politician, Chief Minister (1996–1997).
- A. George Pradel, 80, American politician, Mayor of Naperville, Illinois (1995–2015), cancer.
- John W. Rogerson, 83, British Anglican priest and biblical scholar.
- Elisa Serna, 75, Spanish protest singer-songwriter, heart attack.
- Krzysztof Sitko, 50, Polish footballer (GKS Tychy).

=== 5 ===
- Roger Aguilar Salazar, 79, Mexican politician, Deputy-elect (since 2018), cerebral hemorrhage.
- Imrich Andrejčák, 77, Slovak general, last Defence Minister of Czechoslovakia (1992), first defence minister of Slovakia (1993–1994).
- Rachael Bland, 40, Welsh journalist and presenter (BBC Radio 5 Live, BBC North West Tonight), breast cancer.
- Jim Borst, 86, Dutch Roman Catholic missionary (Saint Joseph's Missionary Society of Mill Hill), heart failure.
- Minor J. Coon, 97, American biochemist.
- Robert Coulter, 88, Northern Irish politician, MLA for Antrim North (1998–2011).
- François Flohic, 98, French admiral (Free French Naval Forces).
- Salawat Gallyamov, 58, Russian linguist.
- Dennis Green, 87, Australian sprint canoeist, Olympic bronze medalist (1956), cancer.
- Oben Gunderson Jr., 91, American politician.
- Erik Hauri, 52, American geochemist, cancer.
- Arthur Lawrence Hellyer Jr., 95, American radio and television broadcaster.
- Mike Hogewood, 63, American sportscaster (Raycom Sports, FSN South) and professional wrestling commentator (Ring of Honor), heart attack.
- Shubhangi Joshi, 72, Indian actress (Kahe Diya Pardes), stroke.
- Dick Lane, 91, American baseball player (Chicago White Sox).
- Diane Leather, 85, British Olympic middle-distance runner (1960).
- Makdah Murah, 62, Syrian actress.
- Madeleine Yayodele Nelson, 69, American musician.
- Freddie Oversteegen, 92, Dutch resistance member.
- Lise Payette, 87, Canadian journalist, writer and politician, MNA (1976–1981).
- Alan Peart, 96, New Zealand World War II fighter ace (Royal New Zealand Air Force).
- Gilles Pelletier, 93, Canadian actor (Jesus of Montreal, The Barbarian Invasions, R.C.M.P.).
- Vince Phason, 65, American football player (Edmonton Eskimos, Winnipeg Blue Bombers, Montreal Concordes), complications from traffic collision.
- Beatriz Segall, 92, Brazilian actress (Vale Tudo), pneumonia.
- Bhagwatikumar Sharma, 84, Indian Gujarati writer and journalist.
- John Stacpoole, 98, New Zealand architect and architectural historian.
- Rudolph Edward Torrini, 95, American sculptor, complications from Alzheimer's disease.
- Priscila Uppal, 43, Canadian poet, synovial sarcoma.

=== 6 ===
- Peter Benson, 75, English actor (Heartbeat, Blackadder, Albion Market).
- Michel Bonnevie, 96, French basketball player (national team), Olympic silver medalist (1948).
- Richard DeVos, 92, American businessman (Amway) and sports team owner (Orlando Magic), complications from infection.
- Philippe Eidel, 61, French music producer, writer and film composer.
- Ken Eyre, 76, British rugby league player (Hunslet, Leeds, Keighley).
- Liz Fraser, 88, British actress (I'm All Right Jack, Carry On Regardless, Dad's Army), complications from surgery.
- Frank L. Gailer Jr., 94, American brigadier general.
- Will Jordan, 91, American comedian and actor (I Wanna Hold Your Hand), complications of a stroke.
- Johnny Kingdom, 79, English wildlife filmmaker (Johnny's New Kingdom), digger rollover.
- Gilbert Lazard, 98, French linguist and Iranologist.
- Oleg Lobov, 80, Russian politician.
- Sylvia Meehan, 89, Irish women's rights activist.
- Wilson Moreira, 81, Brazilian sambista, singer and songwriter.
- Thad Mumford, 67, American television producer and writer (The Electric Company, M*A*S*H, The Cosby Show), Emmy winner (1973).
- Alan Oakman, 88, English cricketer (Sussex, national team).
- Burt Reynolds, 82, American actor (Smokey and the Bandit, Boogie Nights, Deliverance), Emmy winner (1991), heart attack.
- Claudio Scimone, 83, Italian conductor (I Solisti Veneti).
- Ken Wable, 91, American football player and coach.

=== 7 ===
- Gaston-Armand Amaudruz, 97, Swiss neo-fascist political philosopher and Holocaust denier.
- Jacques Amyot, 93, Canadian long-distance swimmer, cancer.
- Steve Andreas, 82, American psychotherapist and author, complications from Parkinson's disease.
- Jonas Algirdas Antanaitis, 97, Lithuanian politician, MP (1977–1995).
- Robert Bairamian, 83, English cricketer.
- Julio Blanck, 64, Argentine journalist, cancer.
- Samuel Bodman, 79, American politician, Secretary of Energy (2005–2009), complications from primary progressive aphasia.
- Joris Borghouts, 79, Dutch Egyptologist.
- Chang Baohua, 87, Chinese xiangsheng actor.
- Joel M. Charon, 78, American sociologist.
- Janis Claxton, 53, Australian choreographer, lung cancer.
- Harvey Cragon, 89, American engineer.
- V. C. R. A. C. Crabbe, 94, Ghanaian judge, Justice of the Supreme Court.
- Drago Grdenić, 99, Croatian chemist and crystallographer.
- Marcelite J. Harris, 75, American air force general, first black woman general in the U.S. Air Force.
- Kurt Helmudt, 74, Danish rower, Olympic champion (1964).
- Anna Karabessini, 95, Greek folk singer and songwriter.
- Alexander Margulis, 97, Yugoslavian-born American professor.
- Mac Miller, 26, American rapper ("Donald Trump", "Frick Park Market", "Self Care"), accidental drug overdose.
- Ingemar Mundebo, 87, Swedish politician, MP (1965–1980), Governor of Uppsala County (1980–1986), Economy minister (1978–1979).
- Ronald Myers, 62, American physician and musician.
- Hans Oleak, 88, German astrophysicist.
- Szarlota Pawel, 71, Polish comic book artist.
- Beverly Polcyn, 90, American actress (Not Another Teen Movie, Hook, Date Movie).
- Donald Robinson, 95, Australian Anglican prelate, Archbishop of Sydney (1982–1992).
- Micheline Rozan, 89, French producer, co-founder of the International Centre for Theatre Research.
- Jennie Mae Rucker, 95, American librarian and educator.
- Bill Shaw, 94, American gospel singer (The Blackwood Brothers).
- Mohsen Vaziri-Moghaddam, 94, Iranian abstract painter.
- Paweł Waloszek, 80, Polish motorcycle speedway rider.
- Sheila White, 69, British actress (Oliver!, I, Claudius, Confessions of a Window Cleaner) and singer, heart failure.
- Yang Side, 96, Chinese PLA general.

=== 8 ===
- Tito Capobianco, 87, Argentine-born American stage director (Pittsburgh Opera), lung cancer.
- Gennadi Gagulia, 70, Abkhazian politician, Prime Minister (1995–1997, 2002–2003, since 2018), traffic collision.
- Giancarlo Galdiolo, 69, Italian footballer (Fiorentina, Sampdoria), frontotemporal dementia.
- Reidar Goa, 76, Norwegian footballer (Viking, national team).
- Christopher Harper-Bill, 71, British medieval historian.
- Lorraine H. Morton, 99, American politician, Mayor of Evanston, Illinois (1993–2009).
- Abu Hassan Omar, 77, Malaysian politician, MP (1978–1997), Menteri Besar of Selangor (1997–2000), heart attack.
- Ramin Hossein-Panahi, 23, Iranian convicted Kurdish insurgent, execution by hanging.
- Henry Nordin, 96, Swedish Olympic fencer.
- Erich Riedl, 85, German politician, member of Bundestag (1969–1998).
- Chelsi Smith, 45, American beauty pageant winner (Miss USA 1995, Miss Universe 1995), liver cancer.
- John Tovey, 85, British restaurateur.
- Michael Varley, 78, British Olympic boxer (1964).
- Richard Vincent, Baron Vincent of Coleshill, 87, British military officer and life peer.
- Yang Zhenya, 90, Chinese diplomat, ambassador to Japan (1988–1993).

=== 9 ===
- Simon Adut Yuang, South Sudanese Episcopal prelate, Bishop of Yirol (since 2015), plane crash.
- Frank Andersson, 62, Swedish wrestler (NJPW, WCW) and reality show contestant (Let's Dance 2011), Olympic bronze medalist (1984), bacterial lung infection.
- Dennis Cambal, 69, American football player (New York Jets).
- Wally Choice, 86, American basketball player (Harlem Globetrotters).
- Frank W. Davis, 82, American politician, member of the Oklahoma House of Representatives (1978–2004).
- Silvio Grassetti, 82, Italian Grand Prix motorcycle road racer.
- Akira Hosomi, 75, Japanese chemist.
- Adrian C. Louis, 72, American Lovelock Paiute author and screenwriter (Skins).
- Mr. Catra, 49, Brazilian singer, stomach cancer.
- Krystian Popiela, 20, Polish footballer (Cagliari), traffic collision.
- Beat Richner, 71, Swiss pediatrician and cellist.
- Bill Smith, 80, English cricketer (Wiltshire, Surrey).
- Paul Stuffel, 91, American baseball player (Philadelphia Phillies).
- Wallace Tripp, 78, American illustrator (Amelia Bedelia) and author, Parkinson's disease.
- Javier Usabiaga Arroyo, 79, Mexican politician, Minister of Agriculture (2000–2005) and Deputy (2009–2012).

=== 10 ===
- Kurt Benirschke, 94, German-born American geneticist and pathologist.
- Chris Buttars, 76, American politician, member of the Utah State Senate (2001–2011).
- Adam Clymer, 81, American journalist (The New York Times), pancreatic cancer.
- Warrington Colescott, 97, American artist.
- Peter Donat, 90, Canadian-born American actor (The Godfather: Part II, The X-Files, The China Syndrome), complications from diabetes.
- Richard M. Furlaud, 95, American businessman.
- István Géczi, 74, Hungarian footballer (Ferencváros, national team), Olympic silver medalist (1972).
- Johannes Geldenhuys, 83, South African military commander, chief of the Defence Force (1985–1990).
- Hu Fo, 86, Taiwanese political scientist and activist, member of Academia Sinica, fall.
- Albin F. Irzyk, 101, American military officer.
- Robert Harold Porter, 85, Canadian politician, MP (1984–1993).
- Bianca Reinert, 52, Brazilian ornithologist, cancer.
- Paul Virilio, 86, French philosopher and urbanist, heart attack.
- Roy Wagner, 79, American anthropologist.
- Co Westerik, 94, Dutch painter and photographer.

=== 11 ===
- Richard Newbold Adams, 94, American anthropologist.
- Peter J. Barnes Jr., 89, American politician, member of the New Jersey General Assembly (1996–2007).
- Edwin Davies, 72, English football club owner (Bolton Wanderers) and management accountant.
- Fenella Fielding, 90, English actress (Follow a Star, Carry On Regardless, Carry On Screaming!), stroke.
- Thomas Aquinas Higgins, 86, American judge.
- Jim Houston, 80, American football player (Cleveland Browns), complications from dementia and ALS.
- Kalle Könkkölä, 68, Finnish politician and human rights activist, MP (1983–1987), pneumonia.
- Cheikhna Ould Mohamed Laghdaf, 97–98, Mauritanian diplomat and politician, Foreign Minister (1962–1963, 1978–1979).
- Siegfried Linkwitz, 82, American audio engineer (Linkwitz-Riley filter), prostate cancer.
- M. Sam Mannan, 64, Bangladeshi chemical engineer.
- Kulsoom Nawaz, 68, Pakistani politician, member of the National Assembly (2017–2018), complications from lymphoma.
- Don Newman, 60, American basketball coach (San Antonio Spurs, Washington Wizards) and football player (Saskatchewan Roughriders), cancer.
- Don Panoz, 83, American executive (Panoz, NanoLumens, Mylan), pancreatic cancer.
- Roger Sargent, 91, British chemical engineer.
- Tchan Fou-li, 102, Hong Kong photographer.
- Charlene Todman, 87, Australian athlete.

=== 12 ===
- Shlomo Aronson, 81, Israeli landscape architect.
- Pasquale Buba, 72, American film editor (Heat, Day of the Dead, Mister Rogers' Neighborhood), cancer.
- Ronald Carter, 71, British linguist.
- Don Corbett, 75, American college basketball coach (Lincoln, North Carolina A&T), cancer.
- Barry Cunningham, 78, Australian politician, MP for McMillan (1980–1990, 1993–1996).
- Hossein Erfani, 76, Iranian voice actor, lung cancer.
- Robert Gillam, 72, American investor, stroke.
- Hal Haydel, 74, American baseball player (Minnesota Twins).
- Robert A. Johnson, 97, American Jungian analyst and author.
- Dusan Kadlec, 75, Czech-born Canadian painter.
- Henry Kalis, 81, American politician, member of the Minnesota House of Representatives (1975–2003).
- Erich Kleinschuster, 88, Austrian trombonist and bandleader.
- Hans Kloss, 80, German artist and graphic designer.
- Gerald LaValle, 86, American politician, member of the Pennsylvania Senate (1990–2008).
- Haydn Mainwaring, 85, Welsh rugby union player.
- Geoff Manning, 92, Australian historian.
- Wayne M. Meyers, 94, American microbiologist, chemist and humanitarian.
- Walter Mischel, 88, Austrian-born American psychologist, pancreatic cancer.
- Billy O'Dell, 85, American baseball player (Baltimore Orioles, San Francisco Giants, Atlanta Braves), complications from Parkinson's disease.
- Mark W. Olson, 75, American banker.
- Micael Priest, 65, American artist and raconteur.
- Ralph Prouton, 92, English cricketer and footballer.
- Jorunn Ringstad, 75, Norwegian politician, MP (1993–2005).
- Carl Sargent, 65, British parapsychologist and roleplaying game designer (Fighting Fantasy).
- Frank Serafine, 65, American sound designer and editor (Star Trek: The Motion Picture, Tron, The Hunt for Red October), traffic collision.
- Shen Chun-shan, 86, Taiwanese physicist and academic, President of National Tsing Hua University (1994–1997), ruptured intestine.
- Bettina Shaw-Lawrence, 97, British painter.
- Benedict Ganesh Singh, 90, Guyanese Roman Catholic prelate, Bishop of Georgetown (1972–2003).
- Rachid Taha, 59, Algerian singer (Carte de Séjour), heart attack.
- Albert Ullin, 88, German-born Australian children's bookseller.
- Jack N. Young, 91, American actor and stuntman (Death Valley Days, Wagon Train, How the West Was Won).

=== 13 ===
- Roman Baskin, 63, Estonian actor and director, cancer.
- Diana Baumrind, 91, American psychologist, traffic collision.
- Melvin Brown, 86, American football player and coach.
- Valentin Chaikin, 93, Russian speed skater.
- Evan Copley, 88, American academic and musician.
- Emmanuel Dabbaghian, 84, Syrian Armenian Catholic hierarch, Archbishop of Baghdad (2007–2017).
- Roxana Darín, 87, Argentinian actress.
- Sir William Kerr Fraser, 89, British civil servant, Chancellor of the University of Glasgow (1996–2006), Permanent Secretary to the Scottish Office (1978–1988).
- Lin Hujia, 101, Chinese politician, Mayor of Beijing (1978–1981) and Tianjin (1978), Minister of Agriculture (1981–1983).
- Marin Mazzie, 57, American actress and singer (Ragtime, Kiss Me, Kate, Passion), ovarian cancer.
- Ivo Petrić, 87, Slovenian oboist (Slavko Osterc Ensemble) and composer.
- K. N. T. Sastry, 73, Indian film director and critic.
- Yoko Shindo, 58, Japanese archaeologist, train collision.
- Kyle Stone, 54, American pornographic film actor and comedian, cardiovascular disease.
- John B. Thomas, 93, American electrical engineer.
- Martha Vaughan, 92, American biochemist and physiologist.
- Albrecht Wellmer, 85, German philosopher.
- Charles Richard Whitfield, 90, Northern Irish obstetrician and gynecologist.
- John Wilcock, 91, British journalist (The Village Voice), stroke.

=== 14 ===
- Alan Abel, 94, American prankster and writer, cancer and heart failure.
- Max Bennett, 90, American jazz bassist (L.A. Express) and session musician (The Wrecking Crew).
- Beverly Bentley, 88, American actress (Scent of Mystery, C.H.U.D., The Golden Boys).
- Bernardo Bello, 84, Chilean footballer (Colo-Colo).
- Kenneth Binks, 93, Canadian politician.
- Eusebio Cardoso, 68, Paraguayan Olympic marathon runner (1976).
- Phil Clark, 86, American baseball player (St. Louis Cardinals).
- Ruth Dowman, 88, New Zealand sprinter and long jumper, British Empire Games bronze medalist (1950).
- Majid Gholamnejad, 35, Iranian footballer (Saipa, PAS Hamedan, national team), heart attack.
- Anneke Grönloh, 76, Dutch singer.
- Branko Grünbaum, 88, Yugoslavian-born American mathematician.
- Jeff Hughes, 52, British historian.
- Dinesh Chandra Joarder, 90, Indian politician, MP (1971–1980), MLA (1987–1996).
- Ethel Johnson, 83, American professional wrestler.
- Saeed Kangarani, 64, Iranian actor (My Uncle Napoleon, Dar Emtedade Shab, Marriage, Iranian Style), heart attack.
- Franz Lovato, 95, Austrian Olympic field hockey player.
- Zienia Merton, 72, Burmese-born British actress (The Chairman, Doctor Who, Space: 1999), cancer.
- Carlos Rubira Infante, 96, Ecuadorian pasillo and pasacalle singer-songwriter.
- Barack Obama, 20, New Zealand racehorse, animal euthanasia.
- Chai-Anan Samudavanija, 74, Thai political scientist.
- Rudolf Schieffer, 71, German historian.

=== 15 ===
- Scotty Bloch, 93, American actress (Kate & Allie, The Lunch Date).
- Lady Elizabeth Cavendish, 92, British aristocrat and courtier.
- Helen Clare, 101, British singer
- Peggy Clarke, 80, British chess player.
- John M. Dwyer, 83, American set decorator (Star Trek, Coal Miner's Daughter, Jaws), complications from Parkinson's disease.
- Masashi Fujiwara, 72, Japanese politician, member of the House of Councillors (since 2001), liver cancer.
- Jo Gilbert, 63, British film producer (Closing the Ring), brain tumour.
- James Haar, 89, American musicologist.
- Dorothy M. Kellogg, 98, American politician, member of the South Dakota House of Representatives (1981–1984) and Senate (1987–1992).
- Warwick Estevam Kerr, 96, Brazilian agricultural engineer, geneticist and entomologist.
- Kirin Kiki, 75, Japanese actress (Shoplifters, The Triple Cross, Half a Confession), breast cancer.
- Silvio Liotta, 82, Italian politician, Deputy (1994–2006).
- David Lowenthal, 95, American geographer and historian.
- Mike Margulis, 68, American Olympic soccer player (1972).
- Lionello Puppi, 86, Italian art historian and politician, Senator (1985–1987).
- Charles Rappleye, 62, American writer, cancer.
- Clay Riddell, 81, Canadian geologist and oil executive (Paramount Resources), co-owner of the Calgary Flames.
- David Rubadiri, 88, Malawian poet and diplomat.
- José Manuel de la Sota, 68, Argentinian politician, Senator (1995–1999), Governor of Córdoba (1999–2007, 2011–2015), traffic collision.
- Dudley Sutton, 85, British actor (Lovejoy, The Devils, The Pink Panther Strikes Again), cancer.
- Victor Veselago, 89, Russian physicist.
- Jean Briggs Watters, 92, British cryptanalyst and Women's Royal Naval Service personnel.
- Virginia Whitehill, 90, American women's rights activist.
- Fritz Wintersteller, 90, Austrian mountaineer.
- Ernest Womersley, 86, English footballer (Huddersfield Town).

=== 16 ===
- Iris Acker, 88, American actress (Flight of the Navigator, Whoops Apocalypse, Cocoon: The Return), pancreatic cancer.
- Perry Miller Adato, 97, American documentary film director and producer.
- Maartin Allcock, 61, English multi-instrumentalist (Fairport Convention, Jethro Tull, Robert Plant) and record producer, liver cancer.
- Kevin Beattie, 64, English footballer (Ipswich Town, Middlesbrough, national team), heart attack.
- Tommy Best, 97, Welsh footballer (Hereford United, Cardiff City, Chester).
- Assid Corban, 93, New Zealand politician, Mayor of Waitakere City (1989–1992), cancer.
- Albuíno Cunha de Azeredo, 73, Brazilian engineer and politician, Governor of Espírito Santo (1991–1995).
- John F. Kelly, 69, American politician, member of the Michigan Senate (1979–1994), heart attack.
- Jim Kettle, 93, Australian footballer (Fitzroy).
- Jone Kubuabola, 72, Fijian politician, Minister for Finance (2000–2006).
- Joy Zemel Long, 96, Canadian painter.
- Big Jay McNeely, 91, American R&B saxophonist, prostate cancer.
- Min Naiben, 83, Chinese physicist, member of the Academy of Sciences.
- John Molony, 91, Australian historian.
- Frank Parker, 79, American actor (Days of Our Lives), complications from dementia and Parkinson's disease.
- James B. Thayer, 96, American army brigadier general.
- Butch Wade, 73, American basketball player (Indiana State Sycamores).
- Wang Guofa, 72, Chinese politician, Vice Governor of Jilin Province, Chairman of the Jilin CPPCC.
- Michael Young, 59, Australian footballer (Carlton, Melbourne), cancer.

=== 17 ===
- Celia Barquín Arozamena, 22, Spanish golfer, stabbed.
- Dan Ayala, 81, American college basketball coach.
- Enzo Calzaghe, 69, Italian-born Welsh boxing trainer.
- Captain Raju, 68, Indian military officer and actor (Nalla Naal, Rowdy Alludu, Cotton Mary), complications from a stroke.
- Thomas Cripps, 86, American film historian, complications from Alzheimer's disease.
- Maninder Singh Dhir, 66, Indian politician, complications from a stroke.
- Giorgio Ercolani, 92, Italian Olympic sport shooter.
- Sydney M. Finegold, 97, American physician.
- Stephen Jeffreys, 68, British playwright and screenwriter (The Libertine, Diana), brain tumour.
- Dean Lindo, 86, Belizean politician, member of the House of Representatives (1974–1979, 1984–1989).
- Anna Rajam Malhotra, 91, Indian civil servant (Indian Administrative Service).
- Annette Michelson, 95, American film and art critic, dementia.
- Daniel N. Robinson, 81, American philosopher, heart failure.

=== 18 ===
- Steve Adlard, 67, English football player and coach (Marquette Warriors), cancer.
- James Allan, 86, British diplomat, High Commissioner to Mauritius (1981–1985) and Ambassador to Mozambique (1986–1989).
- Ernie Bateman, 89, English footballer (Watford).
- Gian Luigi Boiardi, 67, Italian politician, Deputy (2001–2005), heart attack.
- Carlo Dell'Aringa, 77, Italian politician, Deputy (2013–2018), heart attack.
- David DiChiera, 83, American composer and founding general director of Michigan Opera Theatre, pancreatic cancer.
- Carl Dodd, 75-76, Irish major general.
- Lady Judith Kazantzis, 78, British poet.
- Piotr Lachert, 80, Polish composer and pianist.
- Carmencita Lara, 91, Peruvian singer.
- Marceline Loridan-Ivens, 90, French writer, film director and Holocaust survivor.
- Titti Maartmann, 97, Norwegian luger.
- Lawrence Martin-Bittman, 87, Czech-born American artist, author and intelligence officer.
- Jean Piat, 93, French actor (Clara de Montargis, Rider on the Rain, The Accursed Kings) and writer.
- Richard M. Pollack, 83, American mathematician.
- Livingstone Puckerin, 49, Barbadian cricketer.
- Robert Venturi, 93, American architect, Pritzker Prize winner (1991), complications from Alzheimer's disease.
- Robert G. Webb, 91, American herpetologist.
- Norifumi Yamamoto, 41, Japanese mixed martial artist (Shooto, Hero's, UFC), stomach cancer.
- Jan Zobel, 71, American LGBTQ rights activist.

=== 19 ===
- Dave Barrett, 63, American news radio correspondent (CBS, ABC, Fox), three-time Edward R. Murrow Award winner, heart attack.
- Sir Louis Blom-Cooper, 92, British lawyer.
- Geta Brătescu, 92, Romanian visual artist.
- Buren Bayaer, 58, Chinese singer and journalist, heart attack.
- Jon Burge, 70, American police officer (Chicago Police Department), suspected mass torturer and convicted perjurer.
- Bunny Carr, 91, Irish television presenter (Quicksilver).
- Catherine Castel, 69, French actress (The Nude Vampire, Lips of Blood).
- Geoff Clayton, 80, English cricketer (Lancashire, Somerset).
- John Hopkins, 81, British academic lawyer.
- Vishnu Khare, 78, Indian poet and writer, stroke.
- Kondapalli Koteswaramma, 100, Indian communist revolutionary and writer, stroke.
- Győző Kulcsár, 77, Hungarian fencer, Olympic champion (1964, 1968, 1972).
- Marilyn Lloyd, 89, American politician, U.S. Representative from Tennessee's 3rd congressional district (1975–1995), complications from pneumonia.
- David Wong Louie, 63, American writer, throat cancer.
- Arthur Mitchell, 84, American dancer and choreographer, founder of the Dance Theatre of Harlem, heart failure.
- Wojciech Myrda, 39, Polish basketball player (Avtodor Saratov).
- Keith Nord, 61, American football player (Minnesota Vikings), cancer.
- Denis Norden, 96, English comedy writer (Take It from Here), television presenter (It'll Be Alright on the Night) and radio personality (My Music).
- Gamil Ratib, 91, Egyptian-French actor (Lawrence of Arabia).
- Pavel Řezníček, 76, Czech poet, writer and translator.
- Jesús Rodríguez Magro, 58, Spanish racing cyclist, heart attack.
- Joseph E. Schwartzberg, 90, American geographer.

=== 20 ===
- Edmundo Abaya, 89, Filipino Roman Catholic prelate, Archbishop of Nueva Segovia (1999–2005).
- İbrahim Ayhan, 50, Turkish politician, MP (since 2011), heart attack.
- Fadhil Jalil al-Barwari, 52, Iraqi military officer, commander of the Iraqi Special Operations Forces, heart attack.
- Maria Bitner-Glindzicz, 55, British geneticist, traffic collision.
- Gerald Buckberg, 82, American surgeon.
- John Cunliffe, 85, English children's book author (Postman Pat, Rosie and Jim), heart failure.
- Ulrich Everling, 93, German jurist, Judge at the European Court of Justice (1980–1988).
- Inge Feltrinelli, 87, German-born Italian publisher and photographer.
- Dave Grosz, 80, American football player (Saskatchewan Roughriders, Montreal Alouettes).
- George N. Hatsopoulos, 91, Greek-born American mechanical engineer.
- Huang Qingyun, 98, Hong Kong-Chinese children's author.
- Jacob Israelachvili, 74, Israeli-born American professor, cancer.
- Joseph Hoo Kim, 76, Jamaican record producer, liver cancer.
- K-Run's Park Me In First, 13, American beagle show dog, winner of the 2008 Westminster Best in Show, cancer.
- Lou Karras, 91, American football player (Washington Redskins).
- Mohammed Karim Lamrani, 99, Moroccan politician and holding investor, Prime Minister (1971–1972, 1983–1986, 1992–1994).
- Roger Mainwood, 65, British animator (Heavy Metal, The World of Peter Rabbit and Friends) and film director (Ethel & Ernest), cancer.
- Laurie Mitchell, 90, American actress (Queen of Outer Space).
- Ranganayaki Rajagopalan, 86, Indian veena player, complications from Parkinson's disease.
- Nils Rydström, 97, Swedish Olympic fencer (1948, 1952).
- Mohamed Sahnoun, 87, Algerian diplomat, Ambassador to the United States (1984–1989).
- Ludovikus Simanullang, 63, Indonesian Roman Catholic prelate, Bishop of Sibolga (since 2007), sepsis.
- Autumn Stanley, 84, American scholar and author.
- Reinhard Tritscher, 72, Austrian Olympic alpine skier (1972), climbing accident.
- Conrado Walter, 95, German-born Brazilian Roman Catholic prelate, Bishop of Jacarezinho (1991–2000).
- Wang Mengshu, 79, Chinese railway engineer, member of the Chinese Academy of Engineering.
- William Ward, 74, American astronomer, brain tumor.
- Henry Wessel Jr., 76, American photographer, lung cancer.
- Riccardo Zinna, 60, Italian actor (Nirvana, This Is Not Paradise, Benvenuti al Sud) and composer, pancreatic cancer.

=== 21 ===
- David Bamigboye, 77, Nigerian military officer and politician, Governor of Kwara (1967–1975).
- Sophie Body-Gendrot, 75, French academic.
- Eigil Friis-Christensen, 73, Danish geophysicist.
- Katherine Hoover, 80, American composer and flutist.
- Adolf Knoll, 80, Austrian footballer (Wiener Sport-Club, FK Austria Wien, national team).
- José Roberto López Londoño, 82, Colombian Roman Catholic prelate, Bishop of Armenia (1987–2003) and Jericó (2003–2013).
- David Laro, 76, American judge.
- Vitaliy Masol, 89, Ukrainian politician, Prime Minister (1994–1995).
- Herbert Meier, 90, Swiss writer and translator.
- Howard Michaels, 62, American businessman, cancer.
- Zinaida Mirkina, 92, Russian poet and translator.
- Kevin Phillips, 89, Australian footballer (Collingwood).
- Beverley Raphael, 83, Australian psychiatrist and academic.
- Bernard Szczepański, 72, Polish Olympic wrestler (1972).
- Lee Stange, 81, American baseball player (Minnesota Twins, Cleveland Indians, Boston Red Sox).
- Trần Đại Quang, 61, Vietnamese politician, President (since 2016), Minister of Public Security (2011–2016), virus.
- Xu Delong, 66, Chinese materials scientist, Vice President of the Chinese Academy of Engineering.

=== 22 ===
- Muriel Baillie, 83, Canadian politician.
- Barry Cohen, 79, American attorney, leukemia.
- Headley Cunningham, 88, Jamaican politician.
- Avi Duan, 62, Israeli politician, member of the Knesset (2012–2013).
- Adel Hekal, 84, Egyptian footballer (Al-Ahly, national team).
- Damian Hill, 42, Australian actor (Pawno), suicide.
- Chas Hodges, 74, British musician (Chas & Dave), organ failure.
- José Ibarburu, 89, Spanish Olympic rower.
- Johannes Kapp, 89, German Roman Catholic prelate, Auxiliary Bishop of Fulda (1976–2004).
- Mike Labinjo, 38, Canadian football player (Calgary Stampeders, Miami Dolphins, Philadelphia Eagles).
- Bob Lienhard, 70, American basketball player (Cantù), cancer.
- Richard Longaker, 94, American political scientist.
- Imtikümzük Longkümer, 51, Indian politician, heart attack.
- Al Matthews, 75, American actor (Aliens, The Fifth Element, The American Way).
- Edna Molewa, 61, South African politician, Minister of Environmental Affairs (since 2010) and Social Development (2009–2010), Premier of North West (2004–2009).
- Dolly Niemiec, 87, American baseball player (AAGPBL).
- Hayden Poulter, 57, New Zealand serial killer, suicide.
- Robert B. Presley, 93, American politician.
- Ottokar Runze, 93, German filmmaker (Five Suspects, In the Name of the People, A Lost Life).
- Mario Valiante, 93, Italian politician, MP (1958–1983).
- Sir Eric Yarrow, 98, British businessman.

=== 23 ===
- Olav Angell, 86, Norwegian poet and jazz musician.
- Juan Marcos Angelini, 31, Argentine motor racing driver, plane crash.
- Baek Sang-seung, 82, South Korean politician, Mayor of Gyeongju (since 2002), lymphoma.
- Eric Berntson, 77, Canadian politician, MLA (1975–1990).
- W. Craig Biddle, 87, American politician.
- Ciriaco Calalang, 67, Filipino politician, member of the House of Representatives (since 2018), stroke.
- Jane Fortune, 76, American author, journalist and historian, cancer.
- Sir Charles Kao, 84, Hong Kong electrical engineer, Nobel Prize laureate (2009), complications from Alzheimer's disease.
- Helmut Köglberger, 72, Austrian footballer (LASK, Austria/WAC, national team).
- Gary Kurtz, 78, American film producer (American Graffiti, Star Wars, The Dark Crystal), cancer.
- Kalpana Lajmi, 64, Indian filmmaker (Rudaali), kidney and liver failure.
- Liu Jie, 103, Chinese politician, Governor of Henan (1979–1981).
- Mark Livolsi, 56, American film editor (The Devil Wears Prada, Saving Mr. Banks, We Bought a Zoo).
- John Anthony Nevin, 85, American psychologist, pancreatic cancer.
- Gary Orefice, 75, American politician.
- Shantaram Potdukhe, 86, Indian politician, MP (1980–1996).
- Mack Pride, 86, American baseball player (Memphis Red Sox, Kansas City Monarchs).
- Kidari Sarveswara Rao, Indian politician, shot.
- Shirley Toulson, 94, English writer and poet.
- Afërdita Tusha, 73, Albanian Olympic sport shooter.
- Gennady Ulanov, 88, Russian politician.
- Harry Walden, 77, English footballer (Luton Town, Northampton Town).
- Derek Wheatley, 92, English barrister and novelist.
- David Wolkowsky, 99, American property developer.

=== 24 ===
- Roy Booth, 91, English cricketer (Yorkshire, Worcestershire).
- J. S. Borthwick, 94, American author.
- Norm Breyfogle, 58, American comic book artist (Batman, Superman, Prime), complications from a stroke.
- Jim Brogan, 74, Scottish footballer (Celtic, national team), dementia.
- Ronald Bye, 80, Norwegian politician, Minister of Transport and Communications (1978–1981).
- José María Hurtado Ruiz-Tagle, 73, Chilean politician, Deputy (1990–1998).
- Peter Maurice King, 78, Australian politician, MP (1981).
- Arnold Krammer, 77, American historian.
- Charles Maingon, 75, French-born Canadian judoka.
- Marion Marshall, 89, American actress (I Was a Male War Bride, The Stooge, Sailor Beware).
- Ivar Martinsen, 97, Norwegian Olympic speed skater (1948, 1952).
- Tommy McDonald, 84, American football player (Philadelphia Eagles).
- Terry Moore, 82, Canadian broadcaster and author, cancer.
- Michael O'Gorman, 53, American coxswain. (death announced on this date)
- Merv Smith, 85, New Zealand radio personality (1ZB) and actor (The Hobbit: The Battle of the Five Armies).
- Fred Smithies, 89, British trade unionist.
- Wally Teninga, 90, American football player (Michigan Wolverines).
- Lars Wohlin, 85, Swedish politician, Governor of the National Bank (1979–1982), MEP (2004–2009).

=== 25 ===
- Helena Almeida, 84, Portuguese photographer and painter.
- Galal Amin, 83, Egyptian economist.
- Evelyn Anthony, 92, British author.
- Charles Berger, 79, American communication theorist, cancer.
- Robert C. Buell, 87, American politician.
- Andrew Colin, 82, British computer scientist.
- Marie Colton, 95, American politician, member of the North Carolina House of Representatives (1978–1994).
- Baba Hari Dass, 95, Indian yoga master, silent monk, and commentator.
- Friedhelm Döhl, 82, German composer.
- Karyn Dwyer, 43, Canadian actress (Superstar, Better Than Chocolate, The Right Way), suicide.
- Pam Hallandal, 89, Australian artist.
- Ismail Fahd Ismail, 78, Kuwaiti novelist and literary critic.
- Ivan Kapitanets, 90, Russian military officer, Admiral of the Fleet.
- Danny Lewicki, 87, Canadian ice hockey player (Toronto Maple Leafs).
- Jack McKinney, 83, American basketball coach (Indiana Pacers, Los Angeles Lakers, Saint Joseph's Hawks).
- Sam Morshead, 63, Irish jockey and horse racing administrator (Perth Racecourse), cancer.
- Wenceslao Padilla, 68, Filipino Roman Catholic prelate, Apostolic Prefect of Ulaanbaatar (since 1992).
- Yadollah Samadi, 66, Iranian film director, heart failure.
- Ronnie Shelton, 57, American convicted serial rapist.
- Jasdev Singh, 87, Indian sports commentator.
- Jerry Thorpe, 92, American director and producer (Kung Fu).
- Vladimir Voronkov, 74, Russian cross-country skier, Olympic champion (1972).
- Julius Whittier, 68, American football player (Texas Longhorns) and prosecutor.

=== 26 ===
- Joe Carolan, 81, Irish footballer (Manchester United, Brighton & Hove Albion, national team).
- Ivan Deyanov, 80, Bulgarian footballer (Dimitrovgrad, Lokomotiv Sofia, national team).
- Eric Griffiths, 65, British academic and literary critic.
- Ignaz Kirchner, 72, Austrian actor (Burgtheater).
- Tito Madi, 89, Brazilian singer and composer.
- George F. Perpich, 85, American dentist and politician, member of the Minnesota State Senate (1971–1980), complications from Parkinson's disease.
- Charles Poliquin, 57, Canadian strength coach, heart attack.
- Roger Robinson, 78, American actor (Joe Turner's Come and Gone, Kojak, Rubicon), Tony winner (2009).
- Manuel Rodríguez, 79, Chilean footballer (Unión Española, national team), complications from Parkinson's disease.
- Antonio Santucci, 89, Italian Roman Catholic prelate, Bishop of Trivento (1985–2005).
- Andrew O. Skaar, 96, American politician, member of the Minnesota House of Representatives (1963–1974).
- José Antonio Tébez, 69, Argentinian footballer (San Martín de Mendoza, Independiente Santa Fe, Independiente Medellín).
- Aamer Wasim, 58, Pakistani cricket player and coach.

=== 27 ===
- Cy A Adler, 91, American author, organiser and conservationist.
- Dean C. Allard, 84, American naval historian and archivist.
- Martin Ash, 76, British musician (Bonzo Dog Doo-Dah Band).
- Marty Balin, 76, American Hall of Fame rock singer and musician (Jefferson Airplane, Jefferson Starship).
- Carles Canut, 74, Spanish actor (The Knight of the Dragon) and theater manager.
- Fermín Donazar, 85, Uruguayan Olympic long jumper.
- Tara Fares, 22, Iraqi model and blogger, shot.
- Ray Fogarty, 61, American politician, member of the Rhode Island House of Representatives (1983–1992).
- Frank Ford, 83, Australian theatre promoter (Adelaide Fringe Festival).
- Frank Herbert, 87, American politician, member of the New Jersey Senate (1977–1981).
- Blagoj Istatov, 71, Macedonian football player (Partizan Belgrade, Utrecht) and manager (Skopje).
- Brian A. Joyce, 56, American politician, member of the Massachusetts Senate (1998–2017).
- James Lawton, 75, British sports journalist and biographer.
- Anita Madden, 85, American racehorse owner, political activist and socialite.
- Kavita Mahajan, 51, Indian writer, pneumonia.
- James G. March, 90, American sociologist.
- Ernest Maxin, 95, British television producer and choreographer (Morecambe and Wise).
- Namkhai Norbu, 79, Tibetan-born Italian Buddhist monk and Dzogchen teacher.
- Michael Payton, 48, American Hall of Fame football player (Marshall Thundering Herd), cancer.
- Manoharsinhji Pradyumansinhji, 82, Indian cricketer (Saurashtra) and politician, MLA (1967–1971, 1980–1985, 1990–1995).
- Virginia Ramos, 65, Mexican-born American chef.
- Joaquim Roriz, 82, Brazilian politician, Governor of the Federal District (1988–1990, 1991–1994, 1999–2006).
- Yvonne Suhor, 56, American actress (The Young Riders), pancreatic cancer.
- Christopher Thacker, 87, English garden historian.
- Philip Trenary, 64, American airline executive (Pinnacle Airlines), shot.
- Michael Walker, 71, English mathematician.
- Art Williams, 78, American basketball player (Boston Celtics), stroke.

=== 28 ===
- Peter Adams, 82, Canadian politician, MPP (1987–1990), MP (1993–2006), cancer and kidney failure.
- Tamaz Chiladze, 87, Georgian writer and poet (The Pond, The Brueghel Moon).
- Barnabas Sibusiso Dlamini, 76, Swazi politician, Prime Minister (1996–2003, 2008–2018).
- Edredon Bleu, 26, British racehorse, winner of the King George VI Chase (2003), euthanised.
- Predrag Ejdus, 71, Serbian actor.
- Peter Gelling, 58, Australian musician and author.
- Ito Giani, 77, Italian Olympic sprinter (1964).
- Rachel Hirschfeld, 72, American animal welfare lawyer.
- Wes Hopkins, 57, American football player (Philadelphia Eagles).
- Bob Jane, 88, Australian race car driver and entrepreneur (Bob Jane T-Marts), prostate cancer.
- Joe Masteroff, 98, American playwright (Cabaret, She Loves Me), Tony winner (1967).
- David Schippers, 88, American lawyer, chief investigative counsel for the U.S. House Judiciary Committee (1998), pancreatic cancer.
- Sidney Shachnow, 83, Lithuanian-born American Army general and Holocaust survivor.
- Rajendra Shah, 68, Indian cricketer.
- Shi Shengjie, 65, Chinese xiangsheng comedian.
- Juris Silovs, 68, Latvian athlete, Olympic silver (1972) and bronze medalist (1976).
- Celso José Pinto da Silva, 84, Brazilian Roman Catholic prelate, Bishop of Vitória da Conquista (1981–2001), Archbishop of Teresina (2001–2008).
- Greg Terrion, 58, Canadian ice hockey player (Toronto Maple Leafs, Los Angeles Kings).
- Allan R. Wagner, 84, American experimental psychologist.
- Margo Woode, 90, American actress (Somewhere in the Night).
- Zang Tianshuo, 54, Chinese rock musician, liver cancer.

=== 29 ===
- Luigi Agnolin, 75, Italian Hall of Fame football referee.
- Macià Alavedra, 84, Spanish politician, Deputy (1977–1979, 1982–1986).
- Alves Barbosa, 86, Portuguese racing cyclist.
- Tulsidas Borkar, 83, Indian harmonium player, chest infection.
- Thomas E. Brennan, 89, American jurist, Chief Justice of the Michigan Supreme Court (1969–1970).
- Pascale Casanova, 59, French literary critic.
- Alain Ducellier, 84, French historian.
- Lewis Elton, 95, German-born British physicist and researcher.
- Eugene John Gerber, 87, American Roman Catholic prelate, Bishop of Dodge City (1976–1982) and Wichita (1982–2001), heart attack.
- Hu Chuanzhi, 88, Chinese engineer and politician, CEO of the China State Shipbuilding Corporation.
- Rolf Knierim, 90, German biblical scholar, traffic collision.
- Frank Maine, 81, Canadian politician, MP (1974–1979).
- Angela Maria, 89, Brazilian singer.
- Billy Neville, 83, Irish footballer (West Ham).
- Henry Ong, 68, Malaysian-born American playwright, cancer.
- Stefania Podgórska, 97, Polish Holocaust heroine and award winner (Righteous Among the Nations).
- Peter Robeson, 88, British equestrian, Olympic bronze medalist (1956, 1964).
- Otis Rush, 84, American Hall of Fame blues guitarist and singer ("All Your Love", "I Can't Quit You Baby", "Double Trouble"), complications from a stroke.
- Richard A. Searfoss, 62, American astronaut.
- Duke Seifried, 83, American miniature model maker.
- Stepan Topal, 80, Moldovan politician, Governor of Gagauzia (1990–1995), MP (1990–1994).
- Mille-Marie Treschow, 64, Norwegian estate owner.
- Dirceu Vegini, 66, Brazilian Roman Catholic prelate, Bishop of Foz do Iguaçu (2010–2018).
- Claudie Weill, 72–73, French historian.
- Earle F. Zeigler, 99, American-Canadian academic.

=== 30 ===
- Phyllis B. Acosta, 84, American public health researcher.
- Maurice Barrette, 62, Canadian ice hockey player.
- Michael J. Bennane, 73, American politician, member of the Michigan House of Representatives (1977–1996).
- Geoffrey Hayes, 76, English television presenter (Rainbow) and actor (Z-Cars), pneumonia.
- David Henderson, 91, British economist.
- Wilhelm Keim, 83, German chemist.
- Walter Laqueur, 97, German-born American historian and journalist.
- Kim Larsen, 72, Danish rock singer, songwriter and guitarist (Gasolin'), prostate cancer.
- Carlos Ángel López, 66, Argentine footballer (Sarmiento, Millonarios, national team).
- John J. McDermott, 86, American philosopher.
- Robert M. O'Neil, 83, American educator, president of the University of Wisconsin System (1980–1985) and the University of Virginia (1985–1990).
- Sonia Orbuch, 93, Polish Jewish resistance fighter and Holocaust educator.
- René Pétillon, 72, French satirical and political cartoonist.
- William Proffit, 82, American orthodontist.
- Sophon Ratanakorn, 87, Thai jurist, President of the Supreme Court of Thailand (1990–1991).
- Tom Spencer, 90, American politician.
- George B. Stallings Jr., 100, American politician.
- Ian Strange, 84, British artist and ornithologist.
- Czesław Strumiłło, 88, Polish chemical engineer.
- Sidney M. Willhelm, 83, American sociologist.
