= Liotta =

Liotta is an Italian surname that is most prevalent in the region of Sicily. It is also found among the American, Argentine, and French Italian diaspora. Notable people with the surname include:

- Aurelio Liotta (1886–1948), Italian Air Force general
- Dennis C. Liotta, American chemist
- Domingo Liotta (1924–2022), Argentine surgeon
- Jay Alan Liotta, United States Department of Defense official
- Jeanne Liotta (born 1960), American visual artist
- Lance Liotta (born 1947), American biologist
- Marc Anthony Liotta (born 1961), Italian-American musician and producer
- Nick Liotta (1928–1951), American football player
- Pasquale Liotta Cristaldi (1850–1909), Italian painter
- Ray Liotta (1954–2022), American actor, voice actor, and film producer
- Shawn Liotta (born 1980), American indoor football coach
- Silvio Liotta (1935–2018), Italian politician

== See also ==
- Stadio Dino Liotta, an arena in Licata, Sicily, Italy
- Liota, a genus of syrphid flies
- Leotta
