= Doris Kumm =

Member of the South Dakota House of Representatives from the 4th district
- In office 1979–1988
- Preceded by: Gary Drake
- Succeeded by: Thomas G. "Torchy" Ries

Personal details
- Born: October 27, 1929 Watertown, South Dakota
- Died: April 5, 2005 (aged 75)
- Party: Republican
- Children: 6

Doris J. Kumm (October 27, 1929 – April 5, 2005) was an American politician who served in the South Dakota House of Representatives.

== Biography ==
Kumm was born on October 27, 1929 in Watertown, South Dakota.

She was first elected to the South Dakota House in 1978, becoming the first woman to be elected representative in the 4th district. She served for five terms, and was a delegate from South Dakota to the National Republican Convention in 1980 and 1988. In 1988, she chose not to seek re-election in the House. She ran for the South Dakota Senate in 1990, winning the primary election, but losing the general election to Democratic incumbent Dorothy Kellogg.

Kumm died on April 5, 2005, at the age of 75.
