= Leotta =

Leotta is an Italian surname which is most prevalent in the region of Sicily and is also to be found among the Argentinian, American, Australian and Brazilian Italian diaspora. Notable people with the surname include:

- Allison Leotta, American novelist, former prosecutor and blogger
- Christian Leotta (born 1980), Italian pianist
- Diletta Leotta (born 1991), Italian television presenter

== See also ==
- Leotta Whytock (1890–1972), American film editor and actress
- Liotta
