= John Tovey (disambiguation) =

John Tovey was a Royal Navy Officer.

John Tovey may also refer to:

- John Tovey (restaurateur)
- John Tovey (royal tutor) to Princess Elizabeth Stuart
- John Tovey (cyclist), see Moulton Bicycle
