= Bass control =

Bass control may refer to:

- Bass management
- Tone control circuit
