= Valiante =

Valiante is a surname. Notable people with the surname include:

- Joseph Valiante, known as Joe Val, (1926–1985), American bluegrass musician and singer
- Mario Valiante (1925–2018), Italian politician
- Michael Valiante (born 1979), Canadian racing driver
