= Borghouts =

Borghouts is a Dutch surname. Notable people with the surname include:

- Harry Borghouts (born 1943), Dutch politician
- Joris Borghouts (1939–2018), Dutch Egyptologist
