= Bass management =

Distribution of low-frequency signals in a multichannel loudspeaker system

The fundamental principle of bass management (also called LFE crossover) in surround sound reproduction systems is to route bass content in the incoming signal, irrespective of channel, to loudspeakers capable of reproducing it, whether the latter are the main system loudspeakers or one or more subwoofers.

== Mapping ==
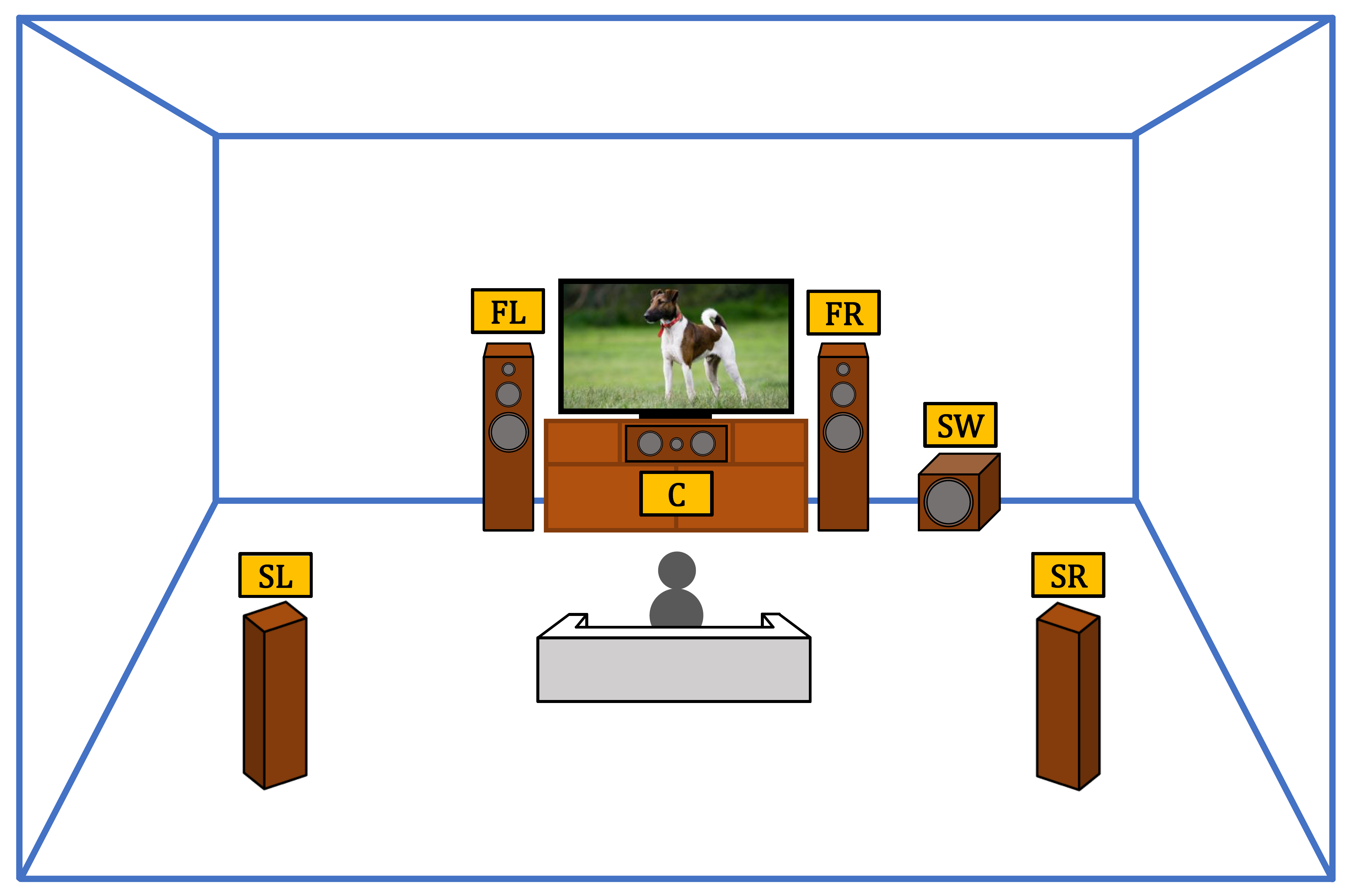
Typical layout of loudspeakers in a 5.1 home theater loudspeaker system.

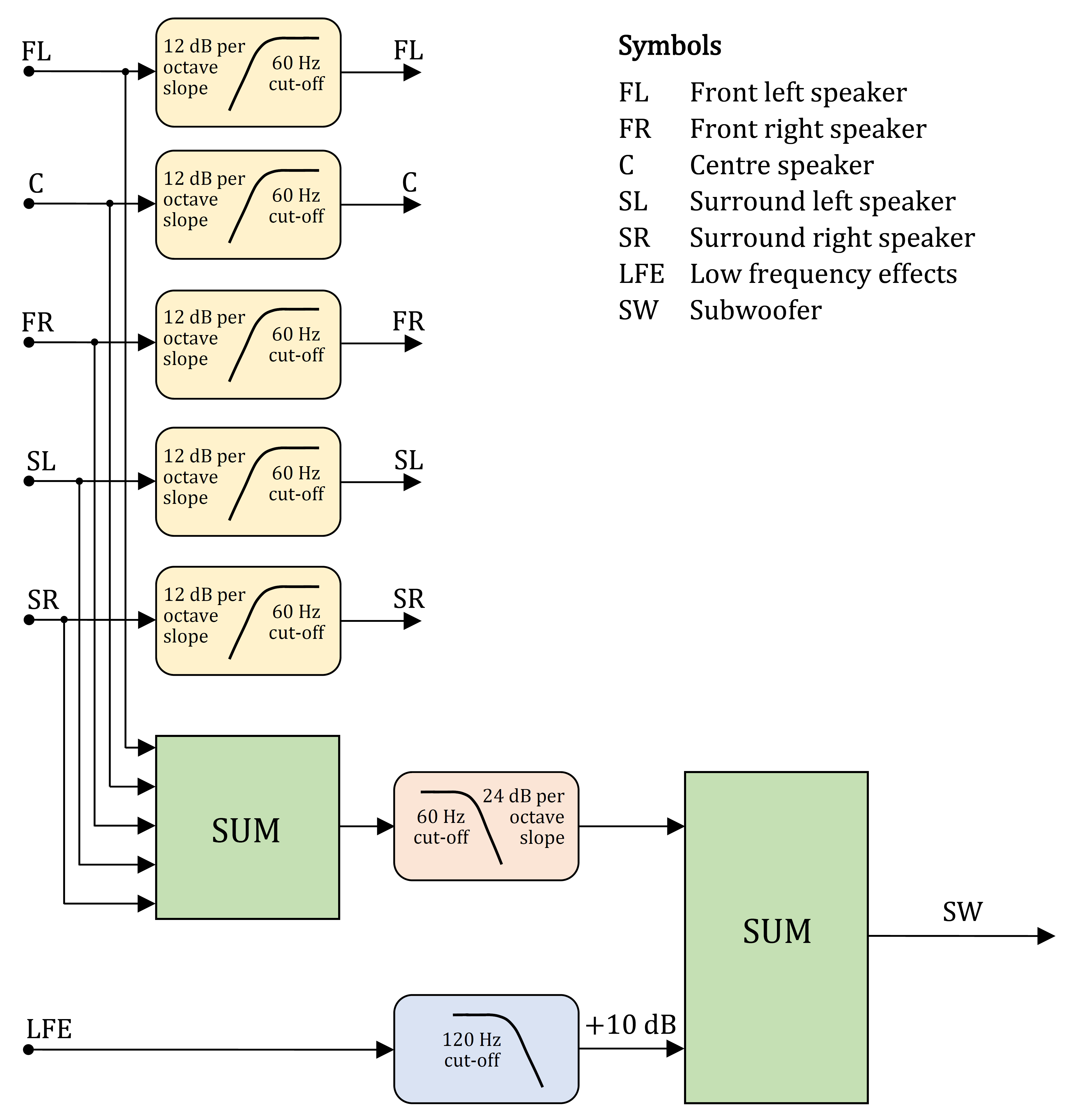
Block diagram of a 5.1 channel bass management system, with nominal filtering characteristics.

There are notation differences between the pre-bass-managed signal and after it has passed through the bass manager. For example, when using 5.1 surround sound:

Example 5.1 bass management mapping
Original	Managed
FL – Front left	FL – Front left
FR – Front right	FR – Front right
C – Center	C – Center
SL – Surround left	SL – Surround left
SR – Surround right	SR – Surround right
AW – Alternative woofer	N/A (incorporated into SW)
N/A (bass can be in any channel)	SW – Subwoofer

As the table shows, the bass manager directs bass frequencies from all channels to one or more subwoofers, not just the content of the low-frequency effects (LFE) channel. However, when there is no subwoofer, the bass manager directs the LFE channel to the main speakers. This is the only time the LFE channel would not be sent to the subwoofer. The key concept is that the LFE channel is not the subwoofer channel.

A typical configuration of a bass-managed 5.1-channel surround-sound loudspeaker system is shown in the first diagram.

As shown in the bass management block diagram, a 5.1-channel audio system consists of five discrete, full-range main channels (front left, center, front right, surround left, and surround right), plus a band-limited low-frequency effects (LFE) channel for added bass (this corresponds to the .1). In such a system, the use of bass management allows the redirection of low-frequency signals from any of the five main speakers to the subwoofer (SW).

The high-pass filters applied to each of the main channels are typically 12 dB/octave and use a Butterworth filter. These are complemented by a 24 dB/octave low-pass filter in the subwoofer feed, which typically uses a Linkwitz-Riley filter topology. This approach takes into account the natural low-frequency responses of the main speakers, which roll off at 12 dB/octave for sealed enclosures, and 18–24 dB/octave for vented enclosures. The aim is to have the low-pass filtered and high-pass filtered signals be −6 dB at the crossover frequency, producing what is known as an acoustical 4th-order Linkwitz-Riley alignment of reasonable accuracy. This helps to ensure that the low-frequency response of each of the main channels is extended downwards with a flat acoustical response. In the diagram, a 60 Hz crossover frequency has been illustrated, but this can typically vary between 40 and 80 Hz.

The LFE channel is a separate channel that contains low frequencies only, and it was originally added to magnetic 70mm-movie soundtracks in the 1970s, to be reproduced through subwoofers. It is designed to be amplified by 10 dB on playback and summed into the signal going to the subwoofer. The LFE channel for movies has a frequency range extending to 120 Hz, and some AV receivers apply a 120-Hz low-pass filter during playback; this frequency is independent of the settings of the low-pass and high-pass crossover filters that are applied to the main speakers. As some less expensive AV receivers offer only a fixed bass-management crossover frequency (often at 80 Hz) using one filter, Dolby 5.1-channel music mixing guidelines recommend that the LFE channel be rolled off at 80 Hz; otherwise, frequency content between 80 and 120 Hz could be lost.
