= Tactile transducer =

Audio device

A tactile transducer or "bass shaker" is a device which is made on the principle that low bass frequencies can be felt as well as heard. They can be compared with a common loudspeaker, just that the diaphragm is missing. Instead, another object is used as a diaphragm. A shaker transmits low-frequency vibrations into various surfaces so that they can be felt by people. This is called tactile sound. Tactile transducers may augment or in some cases substitute for a subwoofer. One benefit of tactile transducers is they produce little or no noise, if properly installed, as compared with a subwoofer speaker enclosure.

== Applications ==
A bass-shaker is meant to be firmly attached to some surface such as a seat, couch or floor. The shaker houses a small weight which is driven by a voice coil similar to those found in dynamic loudspeakers. The voice-coil is driven by a low-frequency audio signal from an amplifier; common shakers typically handle 25 to 50 watts of amplifier power. The voice coil exerts force on both the weight and the body of the shaker, with the latter forces being transmitted into the mounting surface. Tactile transducers may be used in a home theater, a gaming chair or controller, a commercial movie theater, or for special effects in an arcade game, amusement park ride or other application.

Related to bass shakers are a newer type of transducer referred to as linear actuators. These piston-like electromagnetic devices transmit motion in a direct fashion by lifting home theater seating in the vertical plane rather than transferring vibrations (by mounting within a seat, platform or floor). This technology is said to transmit a high-fidelity sound-motion augmentation, whereas "Shakers" may require heavy equalization and/or multiple units to approach a realistic effect.

=== Virtual reality ===
There are other products which employ hydraulic (long-throw) linear actuators and outboard motion processors for home applications as popularized in "virtual reality" rides. These products differ radically from tactile transducers in that they require the manual composition and synchronized playback of motion signals, in addition to the standard soundtrack that the motion is meant to accompany.

== Designs ==
Various designs for tactile transducers have been presented since the 1960s, most of which fall under the "shaker" category. Shakers create a vigorous vibration by moving a mass (usually a magnet) which is bolted to a final mass (like a chair or couch). A simple example of this is the vibration available on a common cellphone. Another way of producing tactile sound uses "linear actuators", which move furniture (usually up and down), rather than shaking it. The main advantage of linear actuators is that they deliver actual motion (ground excursion), not just vibration.

In the 2010s, tactile sound transducers have evolved to include higher frequencies and produce higher fidelity. The human tactile frequency range is from 1 Hz, very low frequency such as earthquakes, up to 5 kHz in some hearing impaired individuals. For most individuals 2 to 3 kHz is the upper threshold for tactile reception. These 2010s-era devices must have higher resolution than previous "shakers" to produce these frequencies. Most humans have tactile resolution to 2 Hz which is the smallest change in frequency that can be perceived. The primary use for this extended bandwidth is to reproduce the vibratory signature for musical instruments such as violins, guitars, the human voice or sound effects in movies (for example, the speeders in Star Wars). Also higher frequencies may be used to augment hearing through bone conduction, a consideration for people who have compromised their hearing from exposure to loud music.

Tactile sound is often used to increase the realism of an artificial environment. For example, mounting a tactile sound transducer in a chair or couch in a home cinema or video game setup can give more of a sense of "being there". For such use, the transducer is often connected to the LFE channel of an A/V receiver. Tactile sound is often used in combination with a subwoofer so that low frequencies can be both felt and heard. To facilitate broadband tactile sound, all channels are summed to provide a full range signal to the transducer amplifier. Graphic equalizers can also be used to further modify the effect.

== In music ==
For musical performance, drummers will often use a tactile sound transducer mounted on their drum stool so they can "feel" themselves playing, rather than using a more conventional stage monitor. The size and power of a stage monitor required to adequately reproduce low frequency drum sounds would be expensive and hard to transport, while a tactile sound transducer can be rather small and require much less power to get the job done. As well, sound engineers may prefer a tactile transducer over a loud, powerful subwoofer monitor cabinet, because a monitor speaker may produce a lot of stage volume.

Nicolas Collins describes several tactile transducers, including some wide-range drivers, which are able to transmit a broader frequency spectrum. The composer David Tudor used tactile transducers in his work Rainforest (1968). He used "Rolen-Star" wide-range drivers to create all kinds of different loudspeaker sculptures. The tactile transducers are attached to large objects such as metal buckets and bring these objects in vibration. The vibrations of these sculptures are then picked up by contact microphones and amplified through a common loudspeaker system. More recent examples can be found in the work of Sabrina Schroeder, who places tactile transducers on bass drums. Lynn Pook attaches small tactile transducers on the bodies of the audience members and Carola Bauckholt used in her piece Doppelbelichtung for violin 12 so-called violin loudspeakers. These consists of violins hanging from the ceiling, each with a small tactile transducer attached to them.
