= Frank Lee Sprague =

American guitarist and composer (1958–2018)

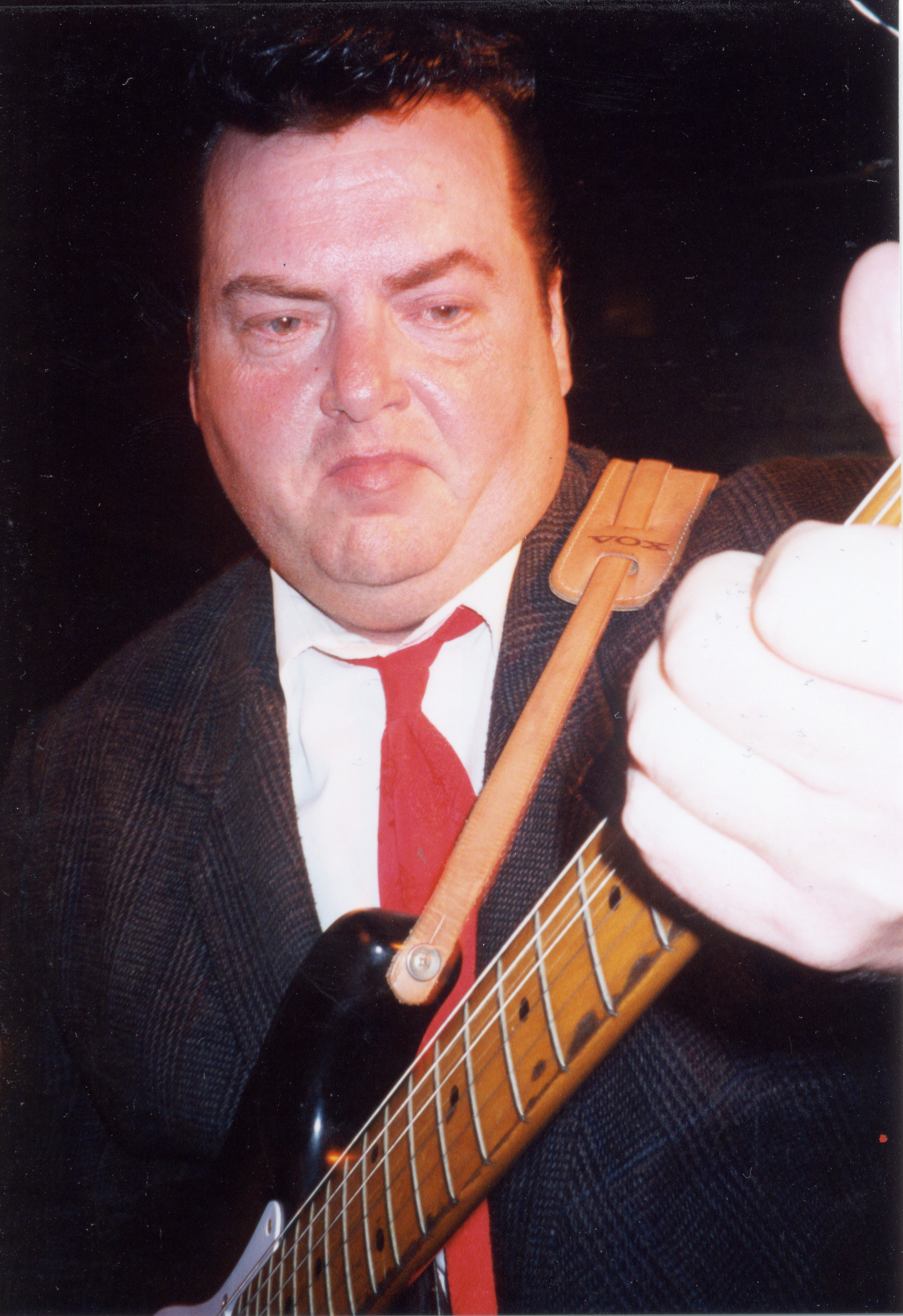
Sprague performing in Japan

Frank Lee Sprague (January 8, 1958 – September 2, 2018) was an American guitarist and composer. He wrote both songs and concert pieces, with his catalog numbering over 1000 works, including two string quartets, three symphonies, many chamber music compositions, and two operas.

Sprague was born in Wichita Falls, Texas in January 1958. In 2004 he released an album of songs in the rock'n'roll style, called Merseybeat, which featured guests Doug Fieger of The Knack and Big Jay McNeely. A sequel called Cavern, whose title is often mistakenly considered as referring to the Liverpool club made famous in the 1960s by The Beatles and other Merseyside performers but is actually a reference to the title track, was released in 2005.

In 2006 he released Merseybeat Mono, which contained all the songs from his first two albums in monophonic sound, as well as Concerto for Violin with Orchestra, the acoustic Fulton Avenue, and the single "She's Good".

Sprague's later releases included Merry Merseybeat Christmas (December 2006) and Merry Christmas, Traditional Carols arranged as Traditional Rock Songs (November 2007), "Fulton Chateau" (November 2008), and "String Quartets No. 1 & 2" (July 2009) on Wichita Falls Records.

He was also the leader of the Sprague Brothers who released several albums on Hightone Records, El Toro, Wichita Falls Records, and other labels.

In 2012, Sprague recorded a cover of the Bad Company single "Can't Get Enough" for a fund-raising CD titled Super Hits Of The Seventies, produced exclusively for radio station WFMU.

He died September 2, 2018, at the age of 60. He left a young widow Cerise Sprague who was the bassist in his band at the time of his death. His ashes were spread in Hunnington Beach, CA at a small private ceremony.
