= Tryambak Vasekar =

Tryambak Vasekar

Tryambak Vasekar (1918–2006) was an Indian painter and art teacher He was born on 13 November 1918 in the small town of Vasa in the Parbhani district of what was then Hyderabad State, India. Vasekar was one of the distinguished personalities in the Marathwada region. After his parents died when he was young, was raised by his grandfather. was interested in all kinds of art, especially painting since childhood. pursued his higher studies in his area of interest in Hyderabad. To pursue his quest, left his first job as a high school teacher and came to Nanded, where he founded 'Abhinav Chitrashala' in 1955. This institution was the first of its kind in the entire Marathwada. His contribution to the field of art was very critical to its revival after the independence in Maharashtra and especially the Marathwada region. While popularizing the art in children all over Maharashtra, this institution also gave an opportunity to the young talent in the Marathwada region to pursue higher studies in painting. Many distinguished personalities were painted through his brush and these portraits adorn many educational institutes. He made a permanent mark in the history of art of the region.

Vasekar also contributed to the field of literature and published several books. His autobiography Smrititarang was published in 2006. He was also active in the freedom struggle of the then-state of Hyderabad for its merger in the independent India.

Tryambak Vasekar died in 2006. His legacy is being continued by several of his disciples spread all over the state. Noted Marathi writer Kavita Mahajan is his granddaughter. The fine arts college founded by him has been renamed in his honor as Kalamaharshi Tryambak Vasekar Chitrakala Mahavidyalaya.
