= Giovanni Battista Urbani =

Italian politician (1923–2018)

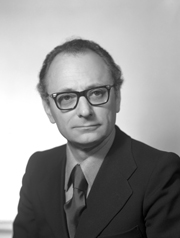

Senator of the Italian Republic
- In office May 25, 1972 – July 1, 1987
- Constituency: Liguria

Personal details
- Born: November 3, 1923 Venice, Italy
- Died: September 2, 2018 (aged 94)
- Party: Italian Communist Party

Giovanni Battista Urbani (November 3, 1923 – September 2, 2018) was an Italian communist politician who served as Mayor of Savona from 1957 to 1958, and as a Senator from 1972 to 1987.

Urbani was born in Venice, Italy on November 3, 1923. He would go on to become a professor and Italian Communist politician.
