= Makdah Murah =

Syrian actress (1956–2018)

Makda Guroji Murah (Arabic: ماكدة مورة; born and died Aleppo, Syria; 1956 - 2018) was a Syrian actress. In 1994, Murah joined the Artists Syndicate and began acting in Aleppo theaters, including the National Theater, the Hour and Funny Theater, and the Aleppo Workers' Union.

Murah acted in many dramas, including People Without People, Night Travelers, Birds of Thorns, and Beautiful and Beautiful Diary. She also starred in the film Dreamy Vision in 2003.
