= Joy Zemel Long =

Canadian painter

Joy Zemel Long

Joy Zemel Long (August 16, 1922 – September 16, 2018) was a Canadian painter who lived in West Vancouver, British Columbia.

Zemel grew up in Vancouver and attended the Vancouver School of Art (later renamed the Emily Carr University of Art and Design), where she studied with Charles H. Scott, Fred Ames, Orville Fisher, Gordon A. Smith, Lionel Thomas, Jack Shadbolt and Bruno Bobak.

In 1947, Joy Zemel married the photographer Jack V. Long who worked with the National Film Board and the CBC, making documentary films. These included Skid Row (1956), In Search of Innocence (1964), a film about artists in Vancouver which featured Joy painting in her studio, and a short film about Arthur Erickson (1982). Through the 1950s and 1960s, Zemel Long's paintings and collages were shown at the 51st Annual Northwest Artists Juried Show at the Seattle Art Museum, at the Vancouver Art Gallery, and as a solo show at the Seymour Gallery in Deep Cove. Zemel Long also exhibited in both solo and group exhibitions at a number of commercial galleries, including the New Design Gallery, the Bau-Xi Gallery, and the Elliott Louis Gallery. In 1972, she designed and constructed a figure for the sculpture garden at the Burnaby Art Gallery at Deer Lake, British Columbia. In 1983, she had a solo show at the same venue entitled Rejoice! Rejoice! which featured a series of paintings entitled Women Waiting. In 1974, Zemel Long designed a cover for Women’s Eye book of poems edited by Dorothy Livesay. In 2012, Zemel Long appeared in A Mother’s Love, a short film by Camille Mitchell. She had one daughter, Frances, from her marriage to Jack Long.
