= Marc Anthony Liotta =

- Born: May 11, 1961 (age 64); Turin, Italy
- Occupations: Musician Independent - Drummer and Percussionist (Live / Studio); Author; Composer; Producer; Vocal Coach; Music Director; Professional Instructor; Head of MMI German Drum Department; Tony Liotta Drum School
- Musical career
- Genres: Rock; Pop; Funk; Soul; Jazz; Latin; World
- Instruments: Drums; all Percussion
- Years active: 1971–present
- Website: tonyliotta.com

Marc Anthony Liotta (pronounced [liˈɔtta]; born May 11, 1961, in Turin, Italy) known as Tony Liotta, is an Italian American musician and producer.

== Early life ==
Tony Liotta drummer and percussionist, was born in 1961 to American / Italian parents in Turin, Italy. In the same year the parents emigrated to USA. There he grew up in New York and New Orleans. He has been playing the drums since childhood. When he was three years old, he got his first drum set. As a teenager, he began his career as a professional drummer.

Liotta came to Germany at the age of 17 and lives in North Rhine-Westphalia since that. He appeared in various television programs in Italy RAI 1, RAI 2, Tele 5, LA7, in Germany WDR and on „arte“. He played at numerous festivals, workshops, concerts in England, France, Italy, Poland, Germany, the Netherlands, and other countries. Liotta masters and plays numerous percussion instruments, such as Derbouka, Tambourine, Frame Drums, Congas, Bongos, Djembe, Timbales, WalkAbout, Gongs, Tahiko, and many others.

== Discography ==
Official Albums
Album	Year
Human Steps	1999
Men at Jazz	2000
Colours of Life	2002
Hot Potato	2016

His Book How To Play The WalkaBoutDrum is expected for 2021

== Awards ==
- German Rock Pop Prize 2020 (best drummer).
- German Rock Pop Prize 2018 (best cover band: Albert Böhne featuring Tony Liotta).
- The single "Funky Donkey" achieved gold status in Italy.
- Lifetime Achievement Award Eurocasting (2016 Italy)
