= Kevin Phillips (Australian footballer) =

Australian rules footballer (1928–2018)

Personal information
- Full name: Kevin John Phillips
- Born: 11 November 1928
- Died: 21 September 2018 (aged 89)
- Original team: Victoria Brewery
- Height: 182 cm (6 ft 0 in)
- Weight: 71 kg (157 lb)

Playing career^{1}
Years	Club	Games (Goals)
1952	Collingwood	2 (3)
- ^{1} Playing statistics correct to the end of 1952.

Kevin John Phillips (11 November 1928 – 21 September 2018) was an Australian rules footballer who played with Collingwood in the Victorian Football League (VFL).
