= Ulrich Everling =

German jurist and judge

Ulrich Everling (2 June 1925 – 20 September 2018) was a German jurist. He was a judge at the European Court of Justice between 6 October 1980 and 6 October 1988.

Everling was born to Emile and Thekla (Née: Wolff) in Berlin, his father was a professor of flight technology. He earned a doctor of law degree at the University of Göttingen in 1952. He then started work for the Federal Ministry for Economic Affairs. In 1970 he became head of the European Policy Division. In 1971 he became a lecturer and four years later an honorary professor at the University of Münster.

Everling was elected a foreign member of the Royal Netherlands Academy of Arts and Sciences in 1990.
