= Tamaz Chiladze =

Georgian writer (1931–2018)

Tamaz Chiladze თამაზ ჭილაძე
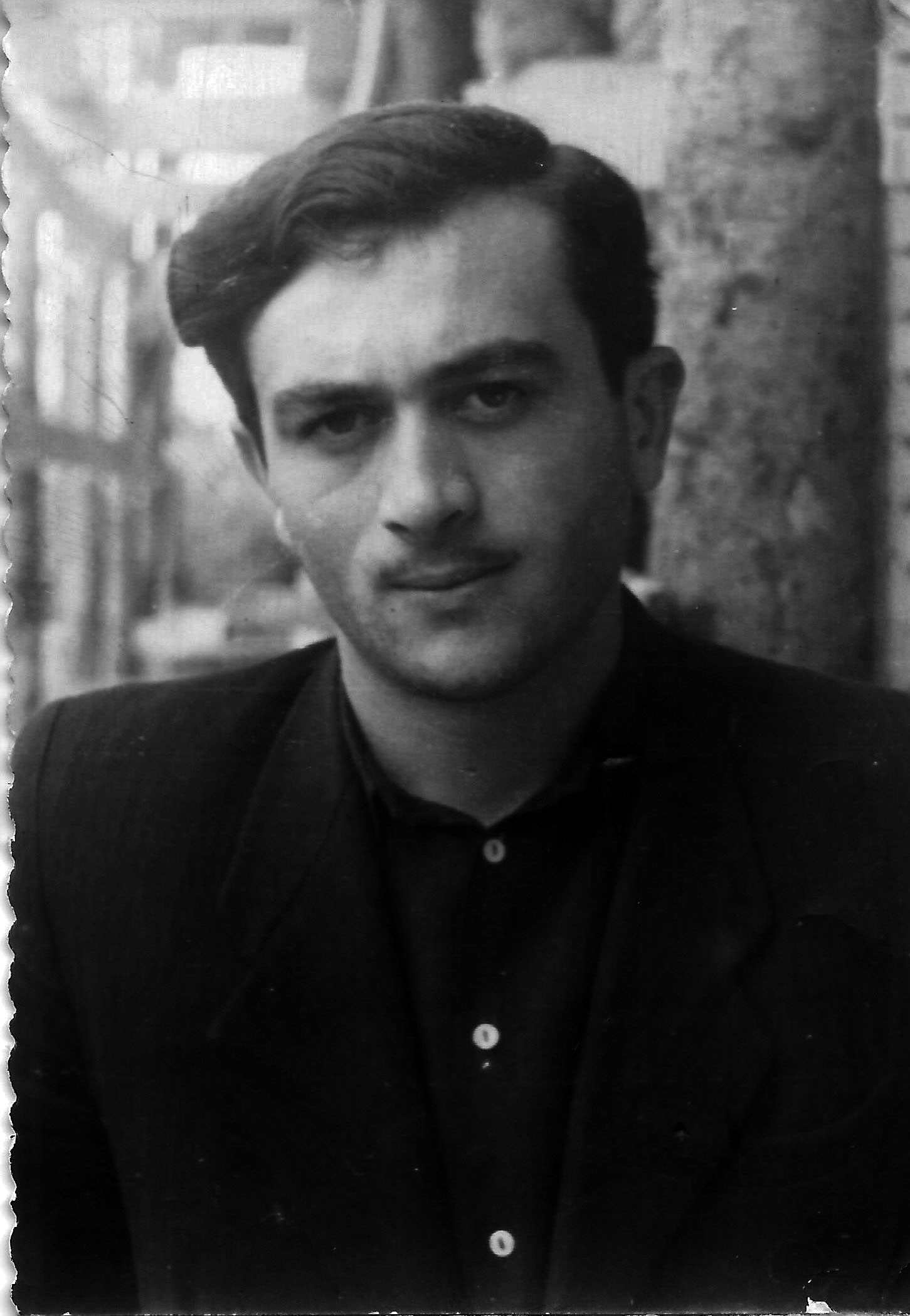
- Born: 5 March 1931; Signagi, Georgia
- Died: 28 September 2018 (aged 87); Tbilisi, Georgia
- Education: Tbilisi State University
- Occupations: Writer, dramatist, poet
- Relatives: Otar Chiladze (brother)

Tamaz Chiladze (Georgian: თამაზ ჭილაძე; 5 March 1931 – 28 September 2018) was a Georgian writer, dramatist and poet. He was the elder brother of Georgian writer Otar Chiladze.

== Biography ==
Chiladze was born to a family of an economist and a writer in 1931 in Signagi, Georgia. He graduated from the Department of Philology of Tbilisi State University in 1954. In the same year, Chiladze published his first collection of poems. Ciskari magazine printed his first story, Taking the Walk with the Pony Phaeton. In 1965, his play The Aquarium was staged at the Rustaveli Theater. He had since been recognized as the author of the anthology of Georgian classical dramaturgy. According to the author, the first critic of his writings was his mother, who was a poet herself.

== Works and awards ==
Chiladze's works have been translated into different languages. He was awarded several prizes, among them the Shota Rustaveli National Prize and the First Prize of West German Broadcasting for the radio-play The Paradise Quartet.

=== Novels ===
- The Wander by Pont Cart
- Winter is Over
- The Pond
- The Sunset Lights
- The Brueghel Moon

=== Poems ===
- The Sun Dial
- The Memory
- The December Sun
- The Noon

=== Plays ===
- The Debutante's Role
- The Eighth Floor Nest
- The Aroma Grass of Arabia
- The Day We Met
- The Farewell to Lions
