= Richard M. Furlaud =

American businessman

Richard M. Furlaud (1923-2018) was an American businessman who headed Squibb Beech-Nut until 1991. Following his retirement in 1991, Furlaud held chairmanships at American Express, International Flavors and Fragrances, and the Rockefeller University board of trustees.

== Early life and education ==
Furlaud was born on 15 April 1923 in New York City. He spent his early life in Europe when his family moved to Paris and remained there until 1941. Upon his return to the United States, he attended Princeton University until graduation in 1943. He then attended Harvard Law School, during which his studies were briefly interrupted due to financial difficulties. He eventually graduated from Harvard Law in 1947.

In 1988, Rockefeller University conferred him an honorary degree for his work in pharma sector.

== Personal life ==
Furlaud married three times. He had three children from his first marriage to Elspeth Banks. His third marriage was to Isabel P. Furlaud.
