= Ken Wable =

American football player and coach (1927–2018)

Biographical details
- Born: August 22, 1927; Van Wert, Ohio, U.S.
- Died: September 6, 2018 (aged 91); Alliance, Ohio, U.S.
- Education: Muskingum

Coaching career (HC unless noted)
- 1952–1953: New London HS (OH)
- 1954–1955: Massillon Washington HS (OH) (assistant)
- 1956–1957: Wake Forest (assistant)
- 1958–1960: Muskingum (assistant)
- 1961: Cornell (assistant)
- 1962–1985: Mount Union

Head coaching record
- Overall: 123–95–2 (college)
- Tournaments: 1–1 (NCAA D-III playoffs)

Accomplishments and honors

Championships
- 1 OAC (1985)

Awards
- 2× OAC Coach of the Year (1982, 1985)

Kenneth Wable (August 22, 1927 – September 6, 2018) was an American football player and coach. He served as the head football coach at Mount Union University in Alliance, Ohio from 1962 to 1985.

Beginning in 1979, Wable began a streak of consecutive winning seasons that persists to this day.

== Head coaching record ==
=== College ===
Year	Team	Overall	Conference	Standing	Bowl/playoffs
Mount Union Purple Raiders (Ohio Athletic Conference) (1962–1985)
1962	Mount Union	3–6	2–5	T–10th	
1963	Mount Union	1–8	1–5	13th	
1964	Mount Union	4–5	3–3	T–7th	
1965	Mount Union	7–2	5–2	T–4th	
1966	Mount Union	4–5	4–4	6th	
1967	Mount Union	2–6–1	2–5–1	10th	
1968	Mount Union	5–4	3–3	8th	
1969	Mount Union	5–4	3–3	9th	
1970	Mount Union	8–1	4–1	5th	
1971	Mount Union	7–2	3–1	3rd	
1972	Mount Union	1–8	0–5	6th (Red)	
1973	Mount Union	3–6	0–5	6th (Red)	
1974	Mount Union	7–2	3–1	2nd (Blue)	
1975	Mount Union	7–2	2–2	3rd (Blue)	
1976	Mount Union	3–6	1–4	5th (Blue)	
1977	Mount Union	4–5	2–3	4th (Blue)	
1978	Mount Union	4–4–1	2–3	T–4th (Red)	
1979	Mount Union	7–2	3–2	T–3rd (Red)	
1980	Mount Union	5–4	4–1	2nd (Red)	
1981	Mount Union	5–4	3–2	T–2nd (Red)	
1982	Mount Union	8–1	4–1	2nd (Red)	
1983	Mount Union	6–3	2–3	T–3rd (Blue)	
1984	Mount Union	6–4	5–3	T–3rd	
1985	Mount Union	11–1	8–0	1st	L NCAA Division III Quarterfinal
Mount Union:		123–95–2	69–67–1		
Total:		123–95–2			
National championship Conference title Conference division title or championship game berth
