= Anna Karabessini =

Greek singer-songwriter (1923–2018)

Anna Karabessini (Greek: Άννα Καραμπεσίνη; 12 June 1923 – 7 September 2018), was a Greek singer-songwriter of traditional and folk music.

== Biography ==
Born in Antimachia, Kos, from her early age her talent in singing appeared as her parents engaged in music and singing. Together with her sister Efi Sarris, they sang traditional songs for many years and are considered "having a prominent position and well known among all those who served the musical tradition of Kos and the Dodecanese"

She moved to Athens in 1947 with her sister Eftyhia. In 1949 he met and married Charalambos Karabessin and lived together for 35 years until 1984 when he died.

In Athens in the early 1950s, her meeting with Simon Karas was decisive for Anna's later artistic career.

In 1952 she returned to Kos for business trips to Athens for recording songs. Anna, accompanied by her sister Eustachia, recorded 23 recordings. Anna and Eftychia, apart from the albums, took part in many TV shows as well as in programs of Hellenic Broadcasting Corporation. She performed in the United States, Canada, and Australia.
