= Kavita Mahajan =

Indian writer

Kavita Mahajan (5 September 1967 – 27 September 2018) was an Indian author and translator who wrote in Marathi. She is noted for her critically acclaimed novels Brr (2005), Bhinna (2007) and Kuhoo (2011), as well as a non-fiction work Graffiti Wall (2009). She was the winner of the 2011 translation award conferred by the Sahitya Akademi, India's National Academy of Letters.

== Early life and education ==
Mahajan was born in the city of Nanded in Maharashtra. She was the daughter of S.D. Mahajan, the ex-secretary of Marathi Vishwakosh and the granddaughter of the painter Tryambak Vasekar.

== Literary career ==
Mahajan wrote on themes of social emancipation and against discrimination. Mahajan's book Brr is a collection of stories about women's sarpanch and their experience after the Panchayati Raj system was implemented whilst she wrote Bhinna to describe the lives of those affected by HIV/AIDS. Both books bring out the politics of representation at three levels – one of the institutions like the Panchayats, the corruption in the non-governmental organisations (NGOs), and the intricacies of human relationships. Mahajan's work focuses on political, social, and economic matters rather than maternal or romantic considerations.

Mahajan's 2011 novel, Kuhoo (Marathi: कुहू) dealt with the relationship between human and nature, and was marketed as a 'multimedia novel'. It came with a DVD containing sights and sounds from nature, including a few animations. She is also renowned for her poetry, including a collection entitled Dhulicha Awaz. She was awarded Sahitya Akademi Translation Prize (2011) for her translation Rajai, a collection of 17 short stories by Ismat Chughtai which she translated from Urdu into Marathi.

Mahajan also authored children's literature and published a collection of short stories Joyanache Ranga (Marathi: जोयानाचे रंग) in 2011. This collection won her the Shashikalatai Agashe Award for Children's Literature in 2013.

Speaking in April 2016 at a programme organised by T. M. A. Pai Chair for Indian Literature at Manipal University (now MAHE), she said: "I am a woman and before that I am a human being. If all are human beings, why is there discrimination? That is a question, which has haunted me from my childhood."

== Death ==
Mahajan died on 27 September 2018 of pneumonia at the Chellaram Diabetes Hospital. She was survived by her daughter.

== Selected works ==
- Bhinna (in Marathi). Pune, India: Rajhans Prakashan. 2020 [First published 2007]. ISBN 978-81-7434-383-3.
- Thhaki Ani Maryadit Purushottam (in Marathi). 2011.
