= Earle F. Zeigler =

Earle F. Zeigler (August 20, 1919 – September 29, 2018) was an American–Canadian academic who was one of the founders of modern American Sport Studies.

== Life ==
Zeigler was born in August 1919 in New York City. After high school he received a BA (German major) from the Bates College in Lewiston, Maine. From 1941 to 1943 he worked as swim coach and director of watersports for the YMCA in Bridgeport, Connecticut. From 1943 until 1949 he was on the faculty of Yale University, where he received his MA (German) and his PhD (Education). He taught Theory of Physical Education, football and Wrestling as well as German at the University of Connecticut. In 1949 he moved to the University of Western Ontario, in London, Ont. where he taught German and from 1950 onward he was the Director of Physical Education also instructing Football, Wrestling and Swimming. From here he moved on to the University of Michigan (1956 – 1963), and the University of Illinois, Champaign, IL (1963 – 1971) where he was the Head of the Physical Education department. In 1971 he became the founding Dean of the Faculty of Physical Education of the University of Western Ontario (until 1989).

From his retirement he continued to lecture and publish. The WorldCat has 269 books of him and he has authored almost five hundred learned articles. In the more recent one he is criticizing physical education for losing focus and not using its full potential to help with the diverse illnesses of modern civilization. In his retirement he lived in British Columbia. He died in September 2018 at the age of 99 in Richmond, British Columbia.

== Honors ==
- 1955–56 vice-president, Canadian Association for Health, Physical Education, and Recreation
- 1966 Fellow National Academy of Kinesiology
- 1974–75 President, Philosophic Society for the Study of Sport (today International Association for Sport Philosophy)
- 1975 Dr. h.c. University of Windsor, Canada
- 1977 Alliance Scholar-of-the-Year (AAHPERD)
- 1981–82 President, National Academy of Kinesiology
- 1983–85 vice-president for Communications, Canadian Association for Health, Physical Education, Recreation and Dance
- 1988 Beginning of the Annual Earle Zeigler Lecture North American Society for Sport Management
- 1986 Honorary Past President, American Society for Sport Management
- 1988 Distinguished Service Award, International Society for Comparative Physical Education and Sport
- 1989 North Hetherington Award Recipients der NAK
- 1990 Gulick-Medal der AAHPERD
- 1991 Beginning of the Annual Earle Zeigler – Honorary Lecture at Western University
- 1997 Dr. h.c. University of Lethbridge
- 2006 Dr. h.c. University of Western Ontario, London, Ont.
