= William Proffit =

American orthodontist (1936–2018)

William Robert Proffit (April 18, 1936 – September 30, 2018) was an American orthodontist.

He was made a fellow of the American Association for the Advancement of Science in 1966. Proffit led the department of orthodontics at the University of North Carolina at Chapel Hill from 1975 to 2001, and became a W.R. Kenan Distinguished Professor in 1992. The American Association of Orthodontists presented Proffit with its inaugural Lifetime Achievement Award in Orthodontic Research in 2017. He taught at UNC until his death in 2018.
