= Sprague Brothers =

The Sprague Brothers are a rock'n'roll duo from Wichita Falls, Texas. Frank Lee Sprague and Chris Sprague. Appearances on CBS Television and reviews in Playboy and Rolling Stone along with many commercial releases and World Tours have solidified the Sprague's place as West Texas Rock'n'roll icons.

== Recordings ==
The Brothers have recorded two albums for Hightone Records, one in 1999 and one in 2000.

The duo's early recordings were issued on such labels as Nesman Records and Tidal Wave Records. Their first release was a "45" recorded and released at Nesman Studios in Wichita Falls, Texas. New albums continue to be recorded, most notably on Wichita Falls Records and also El Toro Records in Spain.

The most recent releases are Changing the World, One Chick At A Time on Wichita Falls Records. The LP features guest appearances by Randy Fuller (Bobby Fuller's brother) and Edan Everly (Don Everly's son), and "The Song".

== In the media ==
The Sprague Bros appeared on CBS Nationwide television to a worldwide audience,{} received reviews in Playboy, Rolling Stone, and the Washington Post amongst others. They have been featured twice on NPR's All Things Considered and All Songs Considered. https://www.npr.org/2000/12/21/1115853/sprague-brothers

== Tours ==
The Sprague Brothers band has toured the US countless times for the past two decades. Their worldwide tours have included every major country and tours of Japan extended their fanbase to the orient.
