= Siegfried Linkwitz =

German American engineer (1935–2018)

Siegfried H. Linkwitz
- Born: November 23, 1935; Bad Oeynhausen, Germany
- Died: September 11, 2018 (aged 82); Corte Madera, California, U.S.
- Education: Stanford University, Darmstadt University of Technology
- Known for: Microwave, RF, EMC
- Scientific career
- Fields: Electrical engineering
- Workplaces: Telefunken Hanover, Siemens Munich, Hewlett-Packard, Audio Artistry

Siegfried Linkwitz (November 23, 1935 – September 11, 2018) was a German American engineer who was noted co-inventor of the Linkwitz–Riley filter along with Russ Riley. He submitted several important technical papers to the Journal of the Audio Engineering Society and other related publications, which have become foundational to modern loudspeaker theory. Examples of his most recent work included extensive development of dipolar loudspeaker theory.

Linkwitz was also a contributor to electronics and "DIY" loudspeaker enthusiast magazines such as Electronics (Wireless) World, and Speaker Builder magazines. He died in 2018 at the age of 82.
