= Yoko Shindo =

Japanese archaeologist

Yoko Shindo Takahashi (1960–September 13, 2018)(真道洋子) was a Japanese archaeologist who specialized in Islamic glasswork.

Shindo graduated from Waseda University in 1979. She earned a master's degree from the same institution in 1985, and a doctorate in 2010. She began working at the university in 1986, then moved to the Middle Eastern Culture Center. In 2009 she worked at the Research Institute for Islamic Archaeology and Culture, and later worked at the Toyo Bunko. Her archaeological excavations mainly took place in Egypt. She also planned exhibitions of Islamic glass in Japan.

On September 8, 2018 Shindo was in an accident with a tram on the last day of a glass conference in Istanbul. She died on September 13, 2018.

== Bibliography ==
- Shindo, Yoko (2004). イスラームの美術工芸. 山川出版社. ISBN 978-4634347601.
- Shindo, Yoko (2020). イスラーム・ガラス. 名古屋大学出版会. ISBN 978-4-8158-1001-6.
