= Sidney M. Willhelm =

American sociologist (1934–2018)

Sidney McLarty Willhelm (October 5, 1934 – September 30, 2018) was an American sociologist, who authored several books on race and urban affairs, and many online articles containing analyses of current events often in a historical context.

== Early life ==
He was born in Galveston, Texas. He was the son of Ernest Virgil (an accountant) and Edythe (Harbour) Willhelm. He earned a B.A. and M.A. from the University of Texas in 1957. He went on to earn a PhD from the same institution in 1961.

== Academic career ==
He was an assistant professor of sociology at San Francisco State University (at the time called San Francisco State College) from 1960 to 1962. He was an assistant professor at The State University of New York at Buffalo from 1962 to 1965; in 1965 he became an associate professor; and retired at the rank of professor in 1990. Willhelm was a visiting associate professor of sociology at McGill University in 1970, and during the summer of 1971 he served as visiting professor at the University of British Columbia.

In 1963 Willhelm introduced a course, "Automation and Society," which examined many of the social transformations which the computer would bring forth, a recurrent theme which is presented in many of his writings.

His book Who Needs the Negro? was printed in 1970. It was reviewed in a number of academic journals, including American Journal of Sociology, Annals of the American Academy of Political and Social Science, and Contemporary Sociology.

Other books he wrote include Urban Zoning and Land-Use Theory (1962) (reviewed in American Sociological Review) and Social Forces; Black and White in America (1983); and America's Economic Elite: A critical review of Andrew Hacker's Two Nations (1994). Willhelm also wrote an article titled, "Black Man, Red Man and White America: The Constitutional Approach to Genocide" (Catalyst, Spring 1969 No.4 pp. 1–62) and composed the online essay, "Understanding the New Imperial Empire: Will America's Past Become America's Future?" (2002).
