= Martha Vaughan =

American biochemist

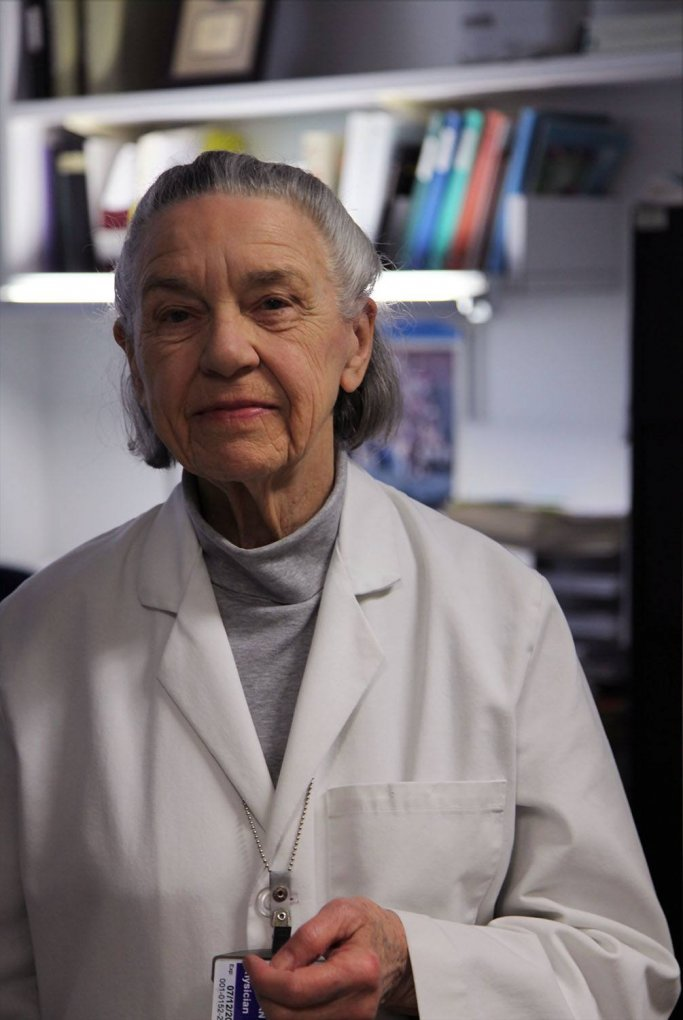
- Born: August 4, 1926
- Died: September 13, 2018 (aged 92)
- Education: University of Chicago; Yale School of Medicine
- Spouse: Jack Orloff
- Scientific career
- Fields: Biochemistry
- Workplaces: National Institutes of Health, National Heart Lung and Blood Institute
- Notable students: Ferid Murad

Martha Vaughan (4 August 1926 – 13 September 2018) was an American biochemist at the National Heart Lung and Blood Institute (NHLBI), part of the National Institutes of Health (NIH) in Bethesda, Maryland. She holds the title of emeritus scientist in the Laboratory of Metabolic Regulation and previously served as chief of NHLBI’s Laboratory of Cellular Metabolism. At the NIH, much of her work has focused on cell signaling, cellular regulation, lipid metabolism, and the identification of key proteins associated with cholera toxin and pertussis toxin. Vaughan first came to the NIH in the agency’s fledgling National Heart Institute, now NHLBI, and with the title of senior assistant surgeon worked on protein synthesis in the Building 3 laboratory of biochemist and public scientist Christian B. Anfinsen, Ph.D., who went on to share the 1972 Nobel Prize in Chemistry

Among scientists mentored by Vaughan was 1998 Nobel Laureate Ferid Murad, who in the late 1960s worked as a researcher studying hormone regulation in her NIH laboratory. “She too was an excellent mentor...she gave me considerable freedom,” he said in his Nobel lecture.

For more than 6 decades at the NIH, Vaughan was active in professional biochemistry societies and other scientific organizations, serving on various editorial and advisory boards. Over the years, she also held a number of research administrative appointments at the NIH related to translational medicine and cell metabolism and metabolic regulation.

== Education ==
In 1944, Vaughan, a Wisconsin native, received her Bachelor of Philosophy degree from the University of Chicago, where noted geneticist Janet Rowley (then Davison) was a classmate. In 1949, Vaughan received her M.D. from the Yale School of Medicine. She then began her research career as a research fellow in Yale’s Department of Physiological Chemistry. Vaughan completed her internship at Yale–New Haven Hospital.

In 1949, while at Yale, Vaughan chaired the Yale School of Medicine chapter of the Association of Internes and Medical Students (AIMS), a national, young doctors' organization founded in 1941. The Yale chapter was known as the Harvey Cushing Chapter. AIMS was concerned the rights of medical students, the draft, vivisection, universal health insurance, racial equality in medical education, and other progressive issues of the time. The organization disbanded in the early 1950s.

== Honors and awards ==
In 1985, Vaughan was elected to the National Academy of Sciences and served as a member of its Committee on Human Rights. In 1991, she was elected a Fellow of the American Academy of Arts and Sciences. She is the recipient of a number of awards presented by the U.S. Department of Health and Human Services, the Public Health Service, and the NIH, including the Meritorious Service Medal conferred upon her by the U.S. Department of Health and Human Services (then the U.S. Department of Health, Education, and Welfare. Three Nobel Prize Winners participated in a 2001 symposium organized to honor her.

== Personal life ==
Vaughan was married to fellow NIH scientist Jack Orloff, M.D., a renal specialist who served as NHLBI scientific director from 1974-1988. The National Heart Lung and Blood Institute continues to offer an annual science award after Dr. Orloff, who died in 1988. Both scientists were recruited to the NIH in the early 1950s, Orloff first in 1950 and Vaughan in 1952.
