= NanoLumens =

American LED display company

Nanolumens
- Type: Private
- Industry: LED displays
- Founded: 2006
- Founder: Richard Cope
- Headquarters: 2221 Northmont Parkway Suite #50 Duluth, GA 30096, U.S.
- Area served: Worldwide
- Key people: Ney Corsino (CEO) Kurt DeYoung (CRO) Rob Lamb (CFO)
- Products: Nixel Series Engage Series Mesh Displays
- Services: Digital signage design and manufacture
- Number of employees: 50-100
- Website: nanolumens.com

Nanolumens Inc. is a private American corporation that designs and manufactures digital LED displays. Since its founding in 2006, it has designed products that target the market gap between consumer flat panel displays and commercial outdoor LED billboards in indoor spaces. It has a full product line of fixed, indoor LED displays in any size, shape, or curvature. It is currently headquartered in Peachtree Corners, Georgia, a North Atlanta suburb.

== History ==
NanoLumens was launched in 2006 by then CEO Richard 'Rick' Cope. NanoLumens now holds over 200 patents on the technology used in their displays.

The company raised more than $10 million from 2006 to 2009 from angel investors to fund their operations, and primarily targets the digital out-of-home (DOOH) market, with sales in the U.S. & Canada, and expansion in Europe, the Middle East, Australia, and South America.

Nanolumens relocated its headquarters at the beginning of 2012 to a new 32,000 square foot office center in the North Atlanta suburb of Peachtree Corners after being courted by the Gwinnett Chamber Economic Development Department and the Georgia Department of Economic Development to stay in the area. The new facility houses the largest digital display showroom in the US. 2012 also marked the company's first full year of commercial production.

== Key personnel ==
- Ney Corsino, CEO
- Kurt DeYoung, CRO
- Rob Lamb, CFO

== Product lines ==
NanoLumens produces digital display solutions targeting the Digital Out-of-Home (DOOH) Market for indoor installations. Displays range from 0.7mm to 10mm pixel pitches depending on the model and can be flat, curved, or cylindrical. Markets served include broadcast facilities, the conventions/hospitality industry, casinos, educational institutions, sports venues, federal systems, transportation hubs, and retail stores.
