= Allison Leotta =

American lawyer

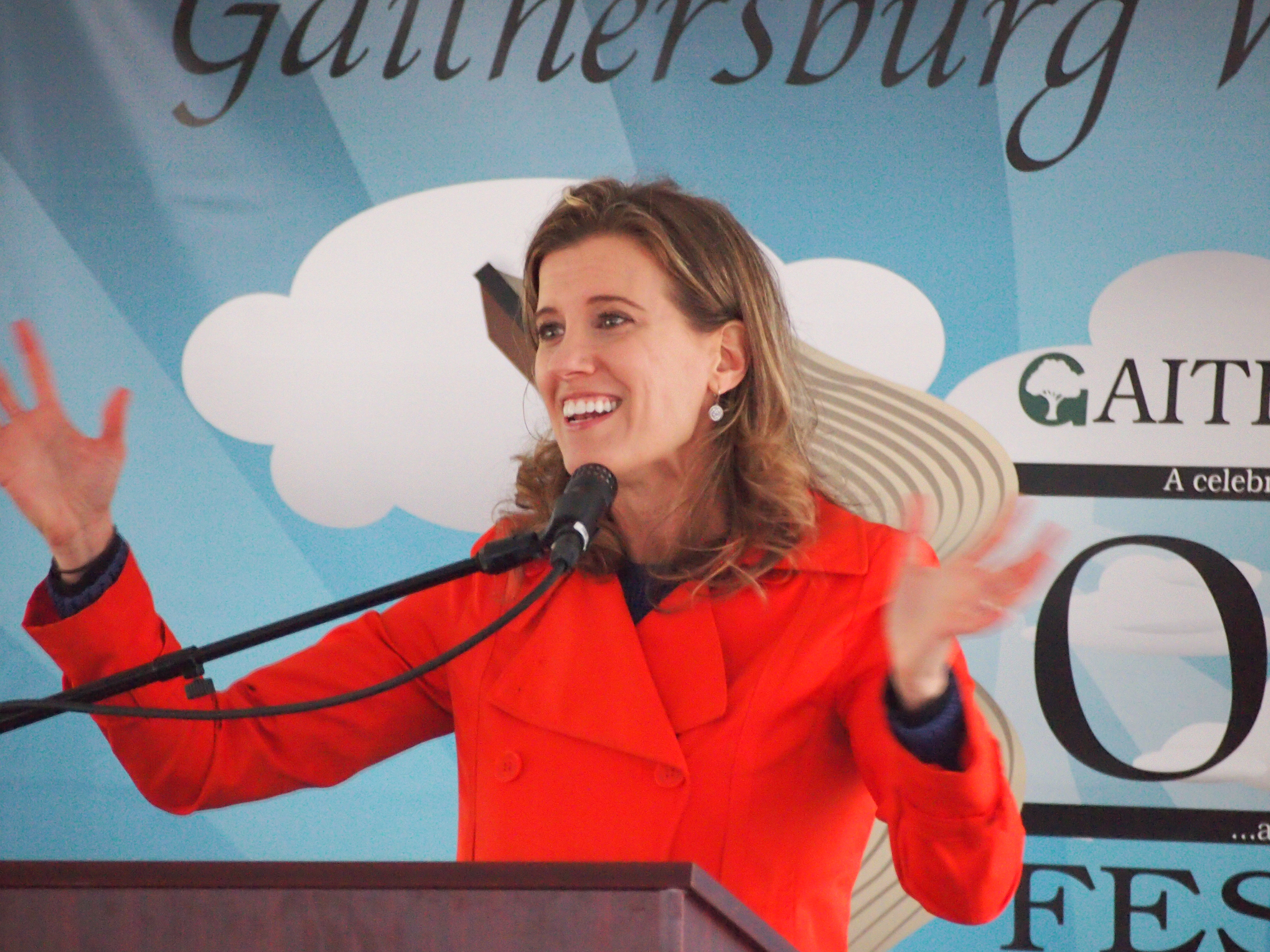
- Born: Detroit, Michigan
- Education: Michigan State University (BS); Harvard University (JD)
- Occupations: Lawyer, author, commentator
- Spouse: Michael Leotta
- Children: 2
- Writing career
- Genres: Legal thriller, crime fiction

Allison Leotta is an American novelist, former prosecutor and blogger, best known for her popular legal crime thrillers. Her books have won various awards and have been placed on multiple best-seller lists. She has been dubbed the "female John Grisham" but has stated that she instead wishes John Grisham to be dubbed "the male Allison Leotta".

Leotta graduated from Michigan State University and Harvard Law School and worked as a federal prosecutor in Washington, D.C., where she specialized in sex crimes, domestic violence and crimes against children. In 2011, she left the Justice Department to become an author full time, writing acclaimed novels such as Law of Attraction, Discretion, Speak of the Devil, A Good Killing, and The Last Good Girl. She currently has TV reviews being carried by the Huffington Post as well running a legal blog known as the Prime-Time Crime Review which the American Bar Association hailed as "one of the best legal blogs in America".

Her first novel, Law of Attraction, was published in 2010, and is part of the critically acclaimed series about the fictional sex-crimes prosecutor, Anna Curtis and her dealings with domestic violence cases. This has stemmed into a series of five books (listed above) written involving Anna Curtis. Leotta has stated in interviews that she has drawn inspiration from her previous legal experiences to write her novels and attributes their success to her first-hand experience as a prosecutor.

== Early life ==
Leotta, was born in Detroit, Michigan. Her father, Alan Harnisch, worked as a federal prosecutor in Detroit, which greatly influenced Leotta to follow in his footsteps.

As a child, Leotta always had an interest in becoming a prosecutor, due to the stories constantly told to her by her father, where he spoke to her in great detail about his past experiences as a prosecutor and stories he had from work. She then went on to attend James Madison College at Michigan State where she completed her Bachelor of Arts in international relations, then Harvard Law School to receive her J.D. degree. After law school, she then clerked for Judge Algenon Marbley, who is a United States district judge of the United States District Court for the Southern District of Ohio. She then ventured onto the Justice Department through the Department of Justice Honours Program, where she specialized in consumer litigation and consumer fraud cases.

== Career ==
=== Law career ===
After graduating from law school, Leotta joined the U.S's Attorney's Office in D.C. in 2003. She was a federal prosecutor in the district, starting off in appellate then continuing on to specialize in misdemeanor domestic violence. She then continued onto general felonies, where she worked on drug and gun cases, as well as crimes against children. She then continued onto felony domestic violence cases. Currently, she holds a senior post in the sex crimes section of the U.S. Attorney's Office and continues to work as both a prosecutor and a writer, stating that she does not intend to stop prosecuting anytime soon and hopes that she can have a healthy work life balance between her two careers, writing and law.

=== Writing career ===
==== Novel writing ====
Due to always being immersed in the complexities of human behavior, which included tragedies as well as stories of immense courage and heroism that she had to deal with everyday as a sex crimes prosecutor, Leotta became inspired to write, and this passion only increased once she got pregnant. "When I got pregnant, a weird sort of biological clock went off. I realised that if I was ever going to write that novel, I had to do it now". She then started writing in the morning before going to work. Then from her real life experience from in office and in court, she started writing her first novel Law of Attraction, with the motivation to inspire other lawyers to become prosecutors in order to protect their community from predators and help victims heal. Her first and subsequent novels have all been under the publisher Simon & Schuster and center around a main character, Anna Curtis, who is a rookie prosecutor who goes through similar experiences Leotta herself has. The book was inspired also by her thinking about a young college student that went missing for several days off campus. She also found her literary agent by reaching out to a former college classmate and states that one's network is the most powerful thing a person can have to propel a career in the writing community. Before the novels were published, the books had to be reviewed by the people in the U.S. Attorney's Office and the Main Justice. This process took about four months to ensure nothing in her book violated Department of Justice ethics rules or was a compromise to national security. The first manuscript in question had to be vetted by six senior prosecutors and the first assistant U.S. Attorney. After the approval of her manuscripts, Simon & Schuster then bought her book. After being told by her publisher to write a sequel to her first book due to good sales and reviews from critics and readers, Leotta decided to give up prosecuting and resigned from her job at the U.S. Attorney's Office in D.C to become a full-time writer, continuing on to write Discretion. Leotta has also stated not only from her law career she has drawn inspiration, but she has also been inspired by the authors such as Jane Austen, John Grisham and Scott Turow as well as The Wire (an American crime drama series). Discretion, which opens with an escort being murdered in a congressman's Capitol hideaway was in fact inspired by the D.C. Madam case as well as the numerous prostitutes prosecuted by Leotta. Her books have been hailed by USA Today "as real as it gets" and she relates the realism of her novels to the fact that she draws on her real life experiences as a sex crimes prosecutor as well as the help she has gotten from her colleagues with regards to legal questions and investigative techniques, such as Glenn Kirschner, the former homicide chief at the U.S. Attorney's Office if she wanted to write in detail about a homicide case. She also is on the board of directors of the Mystery Writers of America.

==== Online works ====
Leotta runs a blog called the Prime-Time Crime Review which was named one of the best legal blogs in America by the American Bar Association. She is also a contributor to the Huffington Post where she is in charge of reality checking television crime dramas. She has stated that there is a difference between people learning their crime facts and what goes on in courtroom dramas for TV shows, and how the two are so drastically different. She has also provided legal commentary and articles for outlets such as CNN, MSNBC, Time, Cosmopolitan, Larry King, and the Detroit Free Press. Leotta has expressed her views towards sexual assault in numerous articles, the most prominent one being the one written for Time magazine, where she states that the saying of "He said, she said" which states that when a woman accuses a man of sexual assault or rape, there is no true way to discern who is in fact lying, is an extremely damaging statement which has resulted in the exclusion of victims of sexual assault and rape from the criminal justice system. According to Leotta, this exception is steeped in misogyny and has prevented many rape cases in the past from being prosecuted and that this problem needs to be corrected immediately, to treat the testimonies of victims of sex crimes the same as other crimes, and not undermine women who come forward as "liars". She then goes on to comment that sexual assault cases will always reveal much more information if they are investigated properly, and that the fear and doubt many have towards a women's testimony comes from the fact that men in society are scared of losing power. She gives facts such that even if corroboration is no longer a requirement in sexual assault cases, DNA samples are often looked upon as solid evidence in such cases and in many cases, survivors, for a multitude of reasons, delay the reporting of such assaults (or never report it at all). Therefore, other types of equally important evidence should be considered and looked at, such as eyewitnesses, past phone calls and text messages and many more. These pieces of evidence may not directly prove what happened on the day itself, but will either undermine or support the credibility and story of the victim, shedding more light on the case and whom to believe. She has also given advice to women regarding reporting sexual assault and how to go about doing so in the Cosmopolitan article she wrote. In the article she wrote for Detroit Free Press, she states that from all her years of prosecuting in sex crimes, 80% of reported sex crimes have been committed by acquaintances of the women, with alcohol being the main tools such men use to commit the assault. Therefore, ending off the article by stating the need for women to be cautious about who they choose to keep company with as they might be unsure to their true predatory nature. She has also expressed in many interviews about how sex crimes are hardly ever reported, especially when men are the victims, with the culture of "victim blaming" being a main cause in the under reporting of such crimes.

== Personal life ==
Leotta lives outside Washington, D.C., with her husband Michael Leotta, the ex appellate chief at the Maryland U.S. Attorney's Office. Her husband helps Leotta in reading her manuscript drafts and gives editing advice. The couple have two children together.

== Awards and honors ==
- Michigan Notable Book of the Year 2017 (The Last Good Girl)
- "Best of the Best Summer Books" by O, The Oprah Magazine (A Good Killing)
- "Best of the Year" from The Strand Magazine
- "Best of the Year" from The Romance Reviews
- "Best of the Year" from Suspense Magazine

== Bibliography ==
A complete listing of works by Allison Leotta.

- Law of Attraction (2010)
- Discretion (2012)
- Speak of the Devil (2013)
- A Good Killing (2015)
- The Last Good Girl (2016)
