= Drago Grdenić =

Croatian chemist and academician (1919–2018)

Drago Grdenić (31 August 1919 – 7 September 2018) was a Croatian chemist and academician and the founder of X-ray crystallography in Croatia. Over the course of his career he determined the structure of a number of mercury complexes and organomercury compounds. He introduced the effective coordination of mercury atom and set rules for structural chemistry of mercury.
