= Jay Alan Liotta =

American Department of Defense senior official

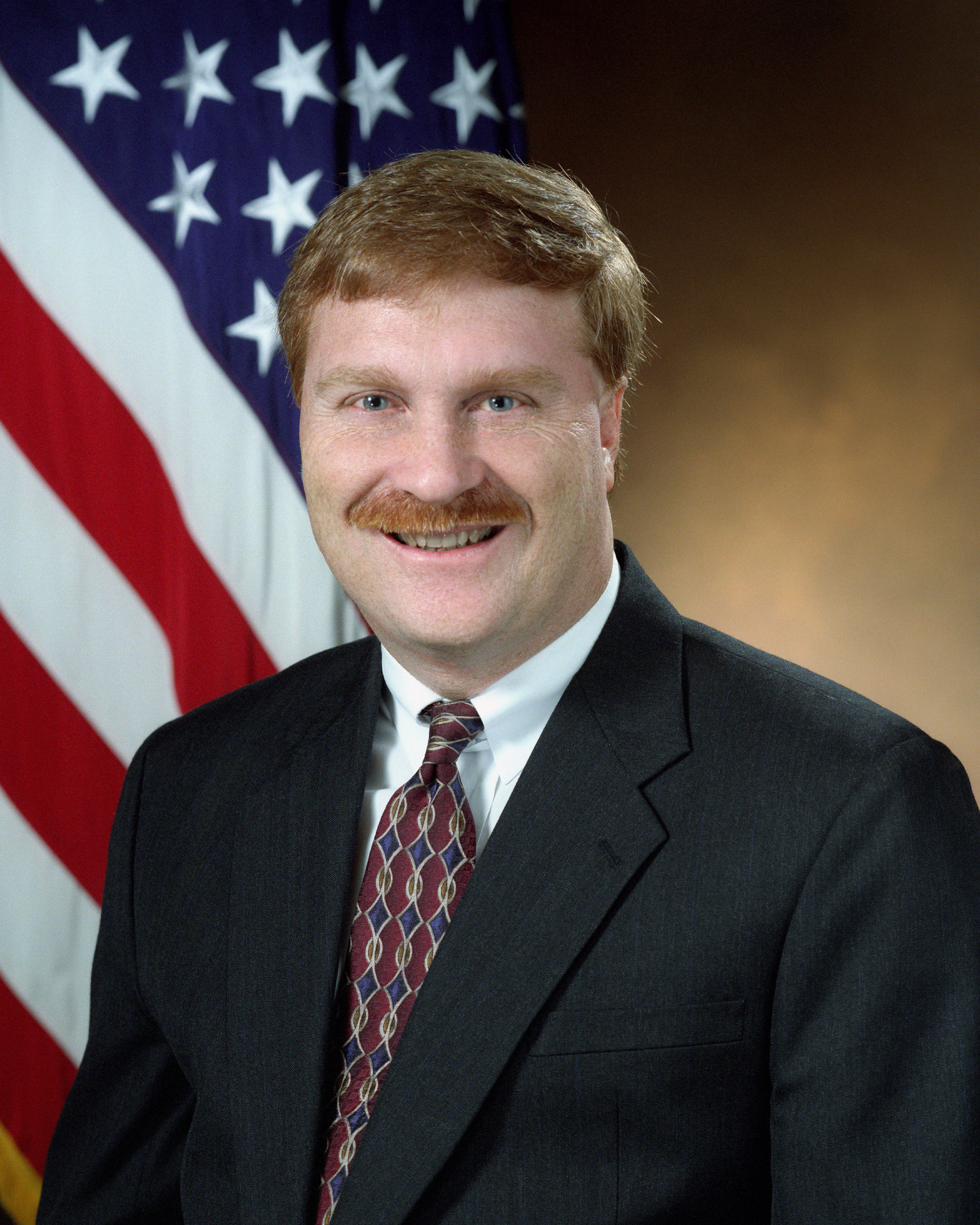
J. Alan Liotta in April 1999

Jay Alan Liotta is an American senior official in the Department of Defense, in its Office of Detainee Policy.

Liotta earned a Bachelor's degree form Wittenberg University in 1982, in Political Science and East Asian Studies. During the summer of 1981 he spent a term in China. Liotta entered the US Government service in 1983. Liotta completed a master's degree at George Washington University's School of Public and International Affairs. Liotta studied Mandarin at University, and much of his Government service has been served in Asia, or working on Asian related issues.

Liotta led the first American delegation to North Korea in 43 years in 1996. He is a recipient of the Presidential Award for Meritorious Service.

In 1997 Liotta was appointed the deputy director of the Defense Departments Prisoner-of-War/Missing Personnel Office.

In February 2006 Liotta was appointed to the position of Principal Director for DOD Detainee Affairs.

In February 2007 Liotta was the deputy to Cully Stimson, and stepped in to be his acting replacement following controversial comments Stimson made calling for corporate America to boycott the law firms that allowed their lawyers to take on Guantanamo captives as clients.

Historian Andy Worthington wrote that when Liotta testified before a subcommittee of the House Foreign Affairs Committee on July 16, 2009, Representative Jim Moran suggested he be held in contempt of Congress. Liotta had been asked to appear before Congress to explain why the Department of Defense had allowed interrogators from foreign nations to interrogate the Guantanamo captives, but they had not allowed members of Congress to meet with them. Moran was angered when Liotta's explanation was that the Geneva Conventions obliged captors to protect captives from "public curiosity".
