= Johannes Kapp =

German Roman Catholic bishop (1929–2018)

Coat of arms of Johannes Kapp

Johannes Kapp (14 May 1929 – September 22, 2018) was a German Roman Catholic bishop.

Kapp was born in Germany and was ordained to the priesthood in 1954. He served as titular bishop of Melzi and as auxiliary bishop of the Roman Catholic Diocese of Fulda, Germany, from 1976 to 2004
