= The Brueghel Moon =

2007 novel by Tamaz Chiladze

- Author: Tamaz Chiladze
- Original title: ბრეიგელის მთვარე
- Translator: Maya Kiasashvili
- Language: Georgian
- Series: Georgian literature series
- Genre: Magic realism, science fiction, novella
- Publisher: Dalkey Archive Press
- Publication date: 2007
- Publication place: Georgia
- Pages: 96 pages
- ISBN: 9781628970937

The Brueghel Moon is a 2007 magic realist novel by Georgian writer Tamaz Chiladze. Novel was published in 2015 in United States by Dalkey Archive Press. Tamaz Chiladze presents a work that blends the genres of post-modernism, magical realism, and science fiction.

== Plot ==
The Brueghel Moon is a novella about a psychiatrist, Levan, who has a former patient, Nunu, visit him, then he goes to a garden party, and gets involved with the wife of an ambassador, Ana-Maria.

=== Major themes ===
The narrative switches around, first person, second person, third person, back to first. The reader sees inside Levan and Nunu's head, but never Ana-Maria's, although Ana-Maria seems to vocalize all of her thoughts to Levan.

The main protagonist, Levan, has been successful until now, but when he has to confront the fact of his wife leaving him, has also to confront the fact that he has seen her all along as a patient rather than an individual. There is also a sub-plot involving an astrophysicist and a “Visitor”. The narrative crosses several timelines, perspectives and worlds and each chapter is from a different perspective.

Tamaz Chiladze focuses on moral problems/issues, arisen as a result of too great a self-assuredness on the part of psychologists. In the novel, the main character is an up-to-now successful psychotherapist Levan, whose wife has left him. One day she suddenly realised that her marriage is nothing more than fact/reality born out of habit and her family is a branch of a hospital. For her husband she wasn't a beloved wife but just a patient. The heroine finds an exit from the vicious circle of misunderstanding and insensitivity.
