= Jacques Amyot (swimmer) =

Canadian swimmer (1924–2018)

- A youthful Amyot at 23 in 1947

Personal information
- Full name: Jacques Amyot
- Born: 13 November 1924 Quebec City, Quebec, Canada
- Died: 7 September 2018 (aged 93) Quebec City, Quebec, Canada
- Occupation: industrial draughtsman
- Spouse: Annie Leclerc
- Children: 4

Sport
- Sport: Swimming
- Coach: Jos Lachance

Jacques Amyot CQ (13 November 1924 – 7 September 2018) was a Canadian swimmer from Quebec. As a long distance swimmer, besides holding 50 records in Quebec and 15 in open water swimming in Canada, qualifying for the 1948 London Olympics, and crossing the English channel twice, he may be best known for winning the first 26 km (16 mile) Marathon race across Lac St. Jean on July 23, 1955 in eleven hours and 32 minutes. The race has continued and is now known as la Traversée internationale du lac St-Jean. As an honored guest, Amyot frequently attended the race and congratulated the winner until his death in 2018.

== Early years ==
Born in Quebec City in 1924, Amyot was interested in a career as a cyclist, but instead turned to long distance swimming. After placing second in a two-mile race at Lake St. Joseph at only fourteen in 1939, he was spotted by coach Jos Lachance.

== Professional career ==
Amyot began swimming professionally in 1948, participating in the Olympic trials for the London Olympics' 1500 metre freestyle. At the time, there was no long distance event at the Olympics. During his career, he won eight national masters titles and even made his mark in the various disciplines of skiing during the 1940s and 1950s.

=== St. Lawrence River, Ile d'Orleans ===
In September 1954, in 57 degree water and a cold rain, he swam the 21 mile stretch of the St. Lawrence River between St. Anne de Beaupre and Quebec City in a record-breaking seven hours. Then, a few months after his exploit at Lac Saint-Jean, he became the only one to manage to swim around Île d'Orléans, a distance of about 80 kilometres (49.7 miles).

=== Lac Saint-Jean ===
On July 23, 1955, Amyot made the first recorded 26 km (16 mile) crossing of Lac Saint-Jean in cold water with storms and high waves. Kim Prive, Chair of the Annual Race across Lac Saint-Jean, considers the crossing a singularly difficult physical challenge, due to the cold water, frequently difficult conditions, and the length of time the swimmers are in the water. He completed the race again in a few subsequent years.

=== English Channel twice ===
At age 31 on July 17, 1956, he crossed the English Channel starting at Cap Gris Nez, France, and swimming to the Strait of Dover in South Foreland, England, completing the twenty miles in 13 hours, 2 minutes in strong currents and 13 °C (55 °F) water. He became the first French Canadian to complete the epic swim. On August 29, 1975, at age 50, he completed the channel loop between countries in a half hour less and became the first man to swim the channel with a nineteen year gap, which was the longest time in between attempts.

=== List of honors ===
Amyot held about 50 records in Quebec and 15 Canadian records in open water swimming. He was elected to the Quebec Sports Hall of Fame in 1993, the Quebec Swimming Hall of Fame in 1998 in the Athlete category with the title of Maître de Québec Saison 1998, and made a Knight of the National Order of Quebec in 2001. After his first successful crossing of Lac Saint-Jean, he was inducted into the International Marathon Swimming Association.

He was made a Chevalier in the Ordre national du Québec in 2001. The town of Roberval, Quebec, as a tribute to his win at Lac Saint-Jean erected a bust in his honour in July 1989, and the Quebec Athlete Gala created a trophy in his name. In 1995, the International Swimming Hall of Fame in Fort Lauderdale, Florida named him an Honor Swimmer for his achievements in open water swimming.

Widely recognized and admired in Canada, in 2008 a pro-beach group in Quebec City known as La Societe des Gens de Baignade proposed naming a downtown Quebec Beach at the Louise Basin Wharf, the "Jacques Amyot Park and Beach." The project hoped to improve environmental protection and offer better public use of an area then used to park private yachts.

== Death ==
Amyot stayed in good condition throughout his life which may have accounted for his longetivity. On the morning of 7 September 2018, it was reported that Amyot died overnight of cancer at age 93. He had worked in Quebec City as an industrial draftsman. He had been married to Annie Leclerc and had had four children.
