= Terry Moore (broadcaster) =

Canadian broadcaster, actor, opera singer, author, and television personality

- Born: 1936
- Died: September 24, 2018 (aged 82); Saanich, British Columbia, Canada
- Spouse: Ramona Moore
- Children: 4
- Presenting career
- Stations: CFAX 1070; CKUA Edmonton; CKFH; CFRB; CKSO TV Sudbury; WSTC Stamford, Connecticut; WTFM New York; CKWX; CJOR; CKNW; QR77 Calgary
- Country: Canada

Terry Moore (1936 – September 24, 2018) was a Canadian broadcaster, actor, opera singer, best-selling author, and television personality. His career lasted 62 years and spanned several stations in Canada and a short stint during the late 1960s in New York City. Since the early 2000s, Moore was a regular on CFAX 1070. He was described as a showman, mentor, and larger than life presence with a great personality by colleague Adam Stirling, Joe Perkins, Mel Cooper, who originally hired him to CFAX, and others.

== Career ==
Moore began his broadcasting career reading the news at CKUA Edmonton in 1956, moving to CKFH and CFRB (Toronto) a short time later. Moore spent time at a number of stations in Edmonton, Calgary, and Kingston, as well as being a news anchor for CKSO TV Sudbury. Later in the '60s, Moore expanded his portfolio, starting at WSTC Stamford, Connecticut and WTFM Lake Success, New York (as Assistant Program Director and morning radio host) while studying Opera and acting. He was a founding member of the Alberta Opera Company.

During the 1970s, Moore moved to Vancouver, working CKWX and CJOR before moving to CKNW for 20 years.

Starting the 1980s, he was the morning radio show host and TV news anchor at QR77 Calgary. In 1993 he hosted a live show interviewing Canada's 21st Prime Minister, Kim Campbell. His coverage of a controversial senate spending increase received national coverage by the Canadian Press. In 1994 he resigned as host of Calgary 7's supper-hour newscast. He left QR77 in 1999, after having worked at the station for five years. He had been commuting weekly from Vancouver to Edmonton. During his time with the station, he became friends with Kirk Douglas. He later hosted a nationwide open line talk show on the network.

He wrote the Canadian best-seller Toothpaste and Peanut Butter (1987), a guide for cleaning items, which sold over 75,000 copies.

In the films My American Cousin and American Boyfriends, he played the uncle.

== Death ==
After a brief battle with cancer, Moore died at Saanich Peninsula Hospital on September 24, 2018. On September 25, 2018, CFAX 1070's programs were held in his memory, interviewing his friends, colleagues, and British Columbia Premier John Horgan, who he interviewed several times. The station broke its usual formatting to broadcast this public memorial, clearing its broadcast schedule on all local programs and playing music he enjoyed, in addition to interviews, a moment of silence, and open lines remembering Moore. He died "on his own terms", opting for a doctor assisted death after being diagnosed with late stage 4 colorectal cancer. He insisted that everyone present break out into song singing "For He's A Jolly Good Fellow", leading them in song with his ailing voice, just before dying, according to his best friend, Ted Smith, who said it was "just who he was".

CFAX concluded its live content at 5:45 pm PT, airing a recording of his final sign-off on the station on July 20, 2018, followed by a minute of silence.
