= José Antonio Tébez =

Argentine footballer (1949–2018)

Personal information
- Date of birth: 13 June 1949
- Place of birth: Comodoro Rivadavia, Argentina
- Date of death: 26 September 2018 (aged 69)
- Place of death: Bogotá, Colombia
- Position: Midfielder

Senior career*
| Years | Team | Apps | (Gls) |
| 1969–1973 | San Martín de Mendoza | | |
| 1974–1977 | Santa Fe | 134 | (9) |
| 1978 | Independiente Medellín | 33 | (3) |
| Total | | 167 | (12) |
- * Club domestic league appearances and goals

José Antonio Tébez (13 June 1949 – 26 September 2018) was an Argentine professional footballer who played as a midfielder for San Martín de Mendoza, Santa Fe and Independiente Medellín.
