= J. S. Borthwick =

American writer (1923–2018)

- Born: September 26, 1923; Buffalo, New York, U.S.
- Died: September 24, 2018 (aged 94); Yarmouth, Maine, U.S.
- Education: Miss Porter's School; University at Buffalo
- Occupation: Writer
- Spouse: James Alexander Creighton Jr. (m. 1947)
- Children: 3
- Writing career
- Pen name: J. S. Borthwick
- Genre: Mystery fiction

Jean Scott Wood Creighton (September 26, 1923 – September 24, 2018) was an American writer of mystery fiction, under the pseudonym of J. S. Borthwick.

== Biography ==
Creighton was born in Buffalo, New York, and studied at Miss Porter's School in Farmington, Connecticut, before matriculating as a pre-medical student at the State University of New York at Buffalo. She left school to work as a nurse at an army hospital during World War II; she married James Alexander Creighton Jr. in 1947 and had three children. After their births she completed her bachelor's degree and returned to the University at Buffalo to pursue a graduate degree in English. For years a summer resident of Maine, she moved to the state full-time in 1976, maintaining a residence in Thomaston. Her novels, featuring as detective a student and later academic of English named Sarah Deane, are mostly set in Maine. Basically cozies in nature, many featured maps and drawings created by one of her daughters to augment the narrative. The first of the books featured a mystery centered on the world of birdwatching; Creighton claimed it was inspired by her observation that birdwatchers were often so intent on their pursuit that they would likely fail, in her opinion, to notice a murder taking place in their immediate vicinity.

Creighton taught English in middle and high schools in Maine, and was an instructor at Indiana University for a time; later in life she taught at Coastal Senior College in Thomaston. Besides mystery fiction, she also wrote poetry and works for children. Creighton died in Yarmouth, Maine.

== Selected works ==
List taken from:

- The Case of the Hook-Billed Kites (1982)
- The Down East Murders (1985)
- The Student Body (1986)
- Bodies of Water (1990)
- Dude on Arrival (1991)
- The Bridled Groom (1994)
- Dolly is Dead (1995)
- The Garden Plot (1997)
- My Body Lies Over the Ocean (1999)
- Coup de Grace (2000)
- Murder in the Rough (2002)
- Intensive Scare Unit (2004)
- Foiled Again (2007)
