= Krzysztof Sitko =

Polish footballer (1967–2018)

Personal information
- Date of birth: 21 October 1967
- Place of birth: Mysłowice, Poland
- Date of death: 4 September 2018 (aged 50)
- Position: Forward

Senior career*
Years	Team	Apps	(Gls)
–1986	Jedność Kosztowy		
1986–1995	GKS Tychy	240	(90)
1995	Górnik Lędziny		
- * Club domestic league appearances and goals

Krzysztof Sitko ([ˈkʂɨʂ.tɔf ˈɕit.kɔ]; 21 October 1967 – 4 September 2018) was a Polish footballer who played as a striker. Throughout most of his career, he was associated with GKS Tychy.

Sitko was born on 21 October 1967 in Mysłowice. He began his career with Jedność Kosztowy. In 1986, he moved to GKS Tychy, where he was the main striker of the team, playing at the time in the III (1986–1992 and 1995) and II (1993–1994) ligas. He was one of the most effective players, appearing in 240 matches and scoring 90 goals. In 1995, he moved to Górnik Lędziny, a team in which he played for about six months. Due to health problems (hypertension), he ended his playing career in the same year.

On 21 June 2009, he took part in Radosław Gilewicz's farewell match as a player of the Polish League Stars team. In 2011, he took third place in the poll for the best sportsman of the 40th anniversary of the Tychy club.

In 2009, one of his sons, Bartłomiej, made his debut for GKS Tychy.

He died on 4 September 2018.
