= Michael Walker (mathematician) =

English mathematician

- Born: 14 January 1947
- Died: 27 September 2018 (aged 71)
- Education: Royal Holloway, University of London
- Scientific career
- Fields: Mathematics
- Workplaces: King's College London; University of Tübingen

Michael Walker OBE (14 January 1947 – 27 September 2018) was an English mathematician who was instrumental in developing the standards that apply to mobile telecommunications and particularly in respect of the SIM card.
