= Christopher Thacker =

English garden historian

Christopher John Charles Thacker (14 March 1931 – 27 September 2018) was an English garden historian.

After graduating from Brasenose College, Oxford, and a Phd at the University of Indiana, he was an academic, but never as a garden historian, a field still emerging in his day. Mostly he taught French literature at Trinity College, Dublin and Reading University. He was the founding editor of the leading academic journal Garden History.

== Selected publications ==
- Masters of the Grotto, Joseph and Josiah Lane (1976)
- The History of Gardens (1979) ISBN 978-0856648205
- Of Oxfordshire Gardens (1982)
- The Wildness Pleases; The Origins of Romanticism (1983) ISBN 978-1138647992
- England’s Historic Gardens (1989) ISBN 978-1859620106
- Historic Garden Tools (1990)
- The Genius of Gardening (1994) ISBN 978-0297833543
- Building Towers, Forming Gardens: Landscaping by Hamilton, Hoare and Beckford (2002) ISBN 978-0950821320
