= The Pond (novel) =

1972 novel by Tamaz Chiladze

- Author: Tamaz Chiladze
- Original title: აუზი
- Language: Georgian
- Genre: Magic realism, Psychological novel
- Publication date: 1972
- Publication place: Georgia
- Pages: 246 pages

The Pond is a 1972 magic realist novel by Georgian writer Tamaz Chiladze. The novel is translated and published in former Eastern Bloc countries including Russia, Estonia and Poland.
