= Dorothy M. Kellogg =

American politician

Member of the South Dakota House of Representatives
- In office 1981–1984

Member of the South Dakota Senate from the 4th district
- In office 1987–1992

Personal details
- Born: July 26, 1920 Minneapolis, Minnesota, U.S.
- Died: September 15, 2018 (aged 98) Watertown, South Dakota, U.S.
- Party: Democratic
- Spouse: Lawrence S. Kellogg
- Children: three
- Profession: accountant

Dorothy Marie Sorteberg Kellogg (July 26, 1920 – September 15, 2018) was an American politician in the state of South Dakota. She was a member of the South Dakota House of Representatives and South Dakota State Senate. She attended Watertown High School and graduated in 1938. Kellogg was also a secretary at the South Dakota State Highway Department, accountant, Chairwoman of the Codington County Democratic Party, and a member of the South Dakota State Democratic Party Executive Board. She was a United Methodist. Kellogg died in September 2018 at the age of 98.
