= Linkwitz–Riley filter =

Type of electronic filter used in audio

Comparison of the magnitude response of the summed Butterworth and Linkwitz–Riley low-pass and high-pass 2nd-order filters. The Butterworth filters have a +3dB peak at the crossover frequency, whereas the L-R filters have a flat summed output.

A Linkwitz–Riley (L-R) filter is an infinite impulse response filter used in Linkwitz–Riley audio crossovers. It is named after its inventors Siegfried Linkwitz and Russ Riley and was originally described in Active Crossover Networks for Noncoincident Drivers. It is also known as a Butterworth squared filter.

A Linkwitz–Riley crossover consists of a parallel combination of a low-pass and a high-pass L-R filter. These filters are typically designed by cascading two Butterworth filters, each providing a −3 dB gain at the cut-off frequency. The resulting Linkwitz–Riley filter has a −6 dB gain at the cut-off frequency. This means that when summing the low-pass and high-pass outputs, the gain at the crossover frequency is 0 dB. As a result, the crossover network behaves like an all-pass, exhibiting a flat amplitude response with a smoothly changing phase response. This is a primary advantage of L-R crossovers compared to even-order Butterworth filter crossovers, whose summed output has a +3 dB peak around the crossover frequency.

Since cascading two n^{th}-order Butterworth filter filters creates a (2n)^{th}-order Linkwitz–Riley filter, theoretically any (2n)^{th}-order Linkwitz–Riley crossover can be designed. However, crossovers of order higher than 4 may be less practical due to their complexity and an increasing peak in group delay around the crossover frequency.

== Common types ==
=== Second-order Linkwitz–Riley crossover ===
Second-order Linkwitz–Riley crossovers (LR2, LR12) have a 12 dB/octave (40 dB/decade) slope. They can be realized by cascading two one-pole filters or by using a Sallen Key filter topology with a Q_{0} value of 0.5. There is a 180° phase difference between the low-pass and high-pass outputs, which can be corrected by inverting one signal. In loudspeakers, this is usually done by reversing the polarity of one driver if the crossover is passive. For active crossovers, inversion is typically achieved using a unity gain inverting op-amp.

=== Fourth-order Linkwitz–Riley crossover ===
Fourth-order Linkwitz–Riley crossovers (LR4, LR24) are currently the most commonly used type of audio crossover. They are constructed by cascading two 2nd-order Butterworth filters. Their slope is 24 dB/octave (80 dB/decade). The phase difference is 360°, meaning the two drivers appear in phase, although the low-pass section has a full period time delay.

=== Eighth-order Linkwitz–Riley crossover ===
Eighth-order Linkwitz–Riley crossovers (LR8, LR48) have a very steep, 48 dB/octave (160 dB/decade) slope. They can be constructed by cascading two 4th-order Butterworth filters.

== See also ==
- Partition of unity
