= Silvio Liotta =

Italian politician (1935–2018)

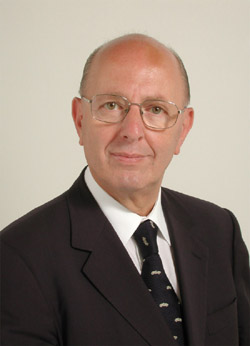
Silvio Liotta in 2001

Silvio Liotta (9 October 1935 – 15 September 2018) was an Italian politician.

A native of Cremona, Liotta was secretary-general of the Sicilian Regional Assembly prior to his election to the Chamber of Deputies in 1994, affiliated with Forza Italia. He left FI for Italian Renewal, from which he was expelled in 1998 because he voted in favor of a no confidence motion ending the Prodi I Cabinet. Liotta subsequently joined the Union of the Centre. Liotta stepped down as deputy in 2006. He died on 15 September 2018 in Palermo.

== Biography ==
After earning a law degree, he joined the Sicilian Regional Assembly in the late 1960s in a management position, becoming its Secretary General in 1986, a post he held until his retirement in 1994.

Member of the Chamber of Deputies for three legislative terms from 1994 to 2006. During the 12th legislative term, he was elected under the majority system in the Partinico district for the Polo della Libertà, joined the Forza Italia (1994) caucus, and became Chair of the Budget Committee.

During the 13th Legislature, after being elected as a member of the Pole for Freedoms, he joined Italian Renewal in January 1997, as part of the center-left coalition L'Ulivo.

The following year, in 1998, he unexpectedly withdrew his support for the Prodi I government, helping to bring about its downfall. Liotta, who was immediately expelled from Lamberto Dini’s party, joined the Christian Democratic Centre.

In 2001, he was re-elected as a member of the House of Freedoms and joined the UDC caucus. His term in Parliament ended on April 27, 2006.

In 2007, he became president of the regional company “Riscossione Sicilia spa.” In 2010, he was a member of the regional coordinating committee of Force of the South.
