= John Tovey (restaurateur) =

English restaurateur (1933–2018)

John Tovey MBE (19 May 1933 – 8 September 2018) was an English restaurateur and one of the first celebrity chefs in Britain in the 1970s. He was known for the Miller Howe hotel and restaurant in Windermere, which he owned from 1971 to 1998.

Born in Barrow-in Furness, at the age of 16 Tovey had forged his father's signature and became a junior clerical officer with the Rhodesian Government, travelling through Africa. Nine years later he returned to Britain and teamed up with friends to buy an old Victorian theatre in his home town, taking a job in hospitality to help support it. Prior to purchasing Miller Howe Tovey worked for Lakeland hotels, where he was promoted to hotel manager.

In the 1960s John Tovey managed the accounts at Her Majesty’s theatre, Barrow- in-Furness. Though he did not appear on stage, he was the most theatrical member of its small company: his manner was light-hearted camp.
