= Joris Borghouts =

Dutch Egyptologist (1939–2018)

Joris Frans Borghouts (17 June 1939 – 7 September 2018) was a Dutch Egyptologist. He was Professor of Egyptology at Leiden University from 1985 to 2004.

== Career ==
Borghouts was born in Ginneken on 17 June 1939. He obtained his doctorate at Leiden University in 1971 with a dissertation titled: The magical texts of Papyrus Leiden I 348. From 1969 to 1976 he worked as a scientific employee at the Egyptological Seminar of the University of Amsterdam. He returned to Leiden University in 1976.

Borghouts succeeded Jac. J. Janssen as professor and head of the Egyptology department in 1985. Under Borghouts the department reached its maximum size. Around the year 2000 the department became threatened by budget cuts. Borghouts defended the needs of the department and stated that he would see the department become academically irrelevant otherwise. Borghouts retired in 2004. However, he remained attached to Leiden University and The Netherlands Institute for the Near East where he became a research fellow in the year of his retirement.

Borghouts was elected a member of the Royal Netherlands Academy of Arts and Sciences in 1999. He died on 7 September 2018 in Leiden.

== Bibliography ==
- The magical texts of Papyrus Leiden I 348 (proefschrift; Leiden, 1971)
- Egyptische sagen en verhalen (Bussum, 1974 en herdrukken)
- "Ancient Egyptian Magical Texts", Nisaba, vol. 9, Leiden, 1978 PDF
- Nieuwjaar in het oude Egypte (inaugurele rede; Leiden, 1986)
- Egyptisch. Een inleiding in schrift en taal van het Middenrijk. Vol. I: Grammatica en syntaxis, Vol. II: Tekenlijsten, oefeningen, bloemlezing. MVEOL 30 (Leiden/Leuven, 1993)
- Book of the Dead [39]: from shouting to structure. Studien zum Altägyptischen Totenbuch 10 (Wiesbaden, 2007)
- Egyptian. An introduction to the writing and language of the Middle Kingdom. Vol. I: Grammar, syntax and indexes, Vol. II: Sign lists, exercises and reading texts. Egyptologische Uitgaven 24 (Leiden/Leuven, 2010)
