= Mario Valiante =

Italian politician (1925–2018)

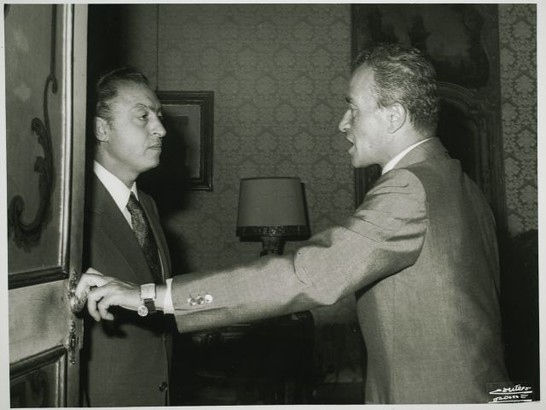
Mario Valiante, at left, with the President of Italian Chamber, Pietro Ingrao, 1976

Mario Valiante (31 August 1925 – 22 September 2018) was an Italian politician who was a Member of Parliament between 1958 and 1983.
