= Samson L. Kwaje =

South Sudanese politician (1945–2010)

Southern Sudan
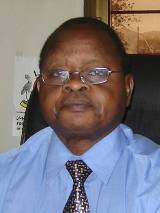
- Samson L. Kwaje

Languages
- Bari, English, and Arabic

Religion
- Christianity

Related ethnic groups
- Nilotic peoples

Samson Lukare Kwaje (July 23, 1945 - August 1, 2010) was a South Sudanese politician and civil servant.

== Background ==
Samson Kwaje was a senior member of the Sudan People's Liberation Movement's Political Bureau, the highest political organ of the former rebel movement that now governs South Sudan. Before joining the SPLM in early 1990s, he held the position of Director General of the Ministry of Agriculture from 1983 - 1986, and from 1986 - 1989 he was Minister of Finance and Economic Planning in the Equatoria Regional Government based in Juba. From 1995 to 2004, Samson Kwaje was put in charge of information desk in the Sudan People's Liberation Movement/Army and became its official spokesperson. He also played a great role during the Naivasha peace talks with the then Government of Sudan which led to the signing of the Comprehensive Peace Agreement (CPA) in 2005. He became a signatory to CPA when he signed in May 2004 the Power Sharing Protocol in Naivasha, Kenya. In 2005 during the formation of the Government of Southern Sudan, Samson Kwaje was appointed the first Minister of Information and Broadcasting. In 2008 he became the Minister of Agriculture and Forestry during a reshuffle. Samson Kwaje had been holding the post even after the elections when the government was formed. Samson Kwaje was the head of the presidential campaign team for the SPLM Chairman and current President, Salva Kiir.

Born in the mid-1940s, Kwaje obtained his master's degree in agriculture (Plant Pathology) at Makerere University in Uganda in 1974 and a PhD in agriculture from the West Virginia University in Morgantown, West Virginia, USA in 1979. Kwaje was from the Pojulu Tribe from Central Equatoria. On Sunday November 15, 2009 an ambush on his vehicle outside Juba, in Central Equatoria State, resulting from a localized political issue, wounded Kwaje and killed five others. Kwaje died after three weeks in intensive care at the Aga Khan Hospital in Nairobi, Kenya, on Sunday 1 August 2010. Kwaje left behind two spouses and seven children.

== See also ==
- Central Equatoria State
- Lainya County
- Pojulu Tribe
