= Kakwa language (disambiguation) =

Kakwa language may refer to:

- Kakuwâ language (Uganda, DRC and South Sudan)
- Kakua language (Colombia and Brazil)
