= Kuku people =

Kuku
Total population
- 28,000

Regions with significant populations
- Central Equatoria

Languages
- Kuku

Religion
- Predominantly: Christianity; Significant minority: Animism

Related ethnic groups
- Other Karo people

The Kuku are a Nilotic tribe of the Karo people from South Sudan. They inhabit the agricultural lands of Kajo Keji County in Central Equatoria State. The Kuku speak a Kuku dialect, also called BaKuku.

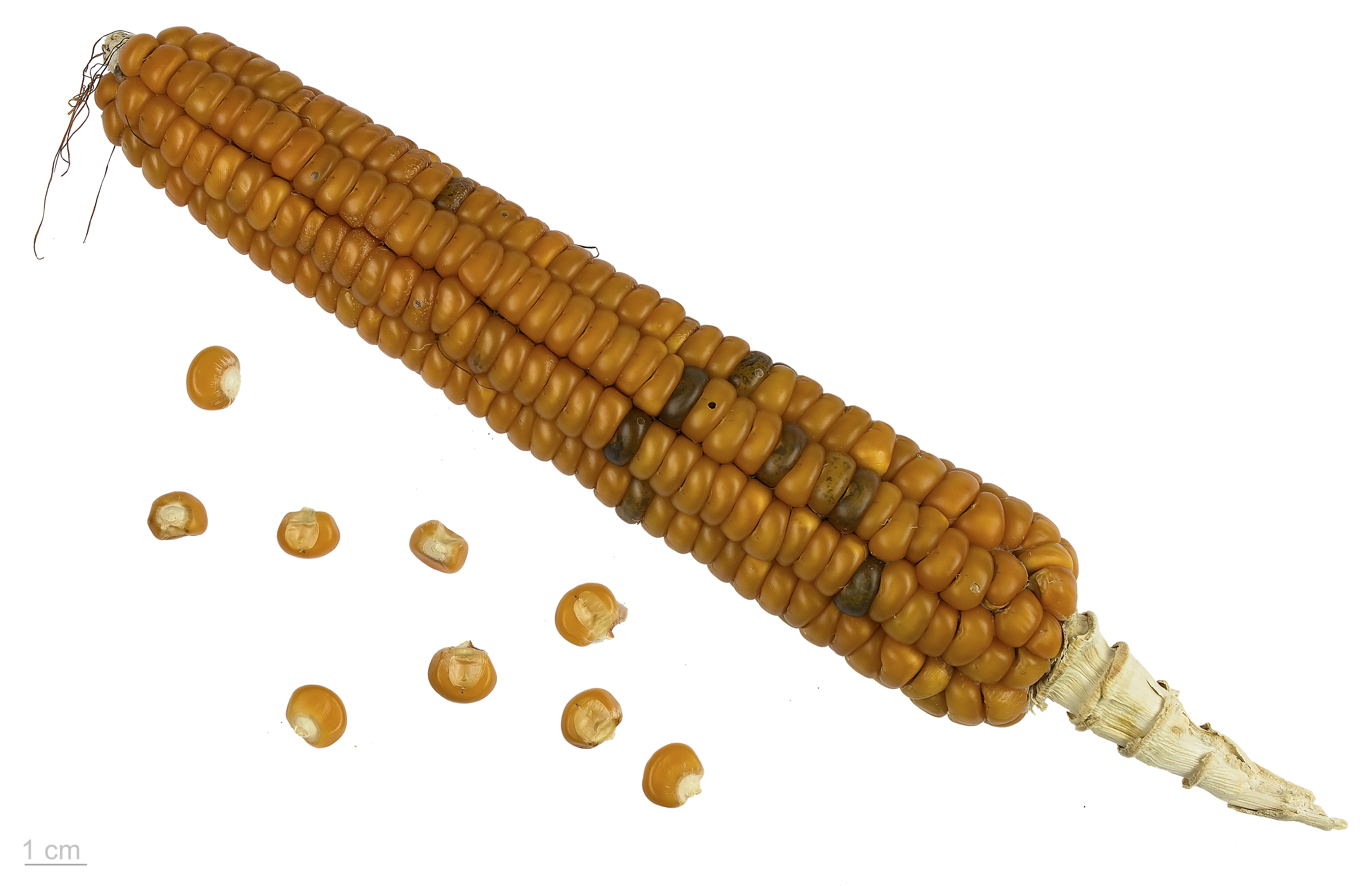
Maize ( Leseri/ Mbaya)

They are chiefly a farming people relying on mixed farming. During the rainy season they grow substantial food crops, mainly sorghum (known by the Kuku people as masika), pigeon peas (burukusuk), maize (mbaya), millet, cassava, sweet potatoes, and beans (loputu). In the dry season they herd cattle, goats and sheep on a small scale. The Kuku are good beekeepers. They practice collective hunting during the dry season, hunting with bow and arrow. Their hunting practices also involve trapping animals in a net as their cultural food, which was believed to be a source of wisdom and knowledge is the rat.

== History ==
The Kuku people are part of a larger group known as the Karo Community (made up of six tribes: Kuku, Bari, Pojulu. Nyangwara Kakwa and Mundari). There was a good deal of in-fighting amongst the larger group and so they decided to spread out into places where each group felt more comfortable. The Kuku was the group that decided to move south and settle. They are rainmakers who are very famous in the tribe. After the first Sudanese civil war in 1972, there was an agreement amongst south Sudanese groups, and prominent members of the Kuku joined south Sudan's leadership.

== Administrative authority system ==
Kuku has no centralized form of administrative authority. Their administrative system emerges from bottom to top as follows:

1. Head of the Family – Husband (Monye Mede)
2. Head of the Clan – Elder man in the Clan (Matat lo Köji)
3. Head of the Village – Village Chief (Matat lo Gwoke)
4. Head of the Area – Area Chief (Matat lo Paranet)
5. Head of the Tribe – Head Chief (Matat lo Jur) highest authority man in the tribe

With their strong belief in God and God's works through their ancestors, the Kuku tribe have their chiefs associated with water. These chiefs are hence, responsible for rain controls during the crop growing seasons of the year.

== Kuku land and the district – (Kuku and Kajo-Keji) ==
The land of the Kuku people is called Kuku and the administrative coverage area, which is the County, is given the name Kajo-Keji, after the name of the tribe's chief (Kajok-Köji) who was in power during the British rule in the Sudan. Kajo-Keji lies in the southernmost part of South Sudan near the Uganda border districts of Moyo and Yumbe. It has an area of almost 112,600 km² and comprises five administrative local areas known as Payams. These are:

- Kaŋapo I
- Kaŋapo II
- Lire
- Liwolo
- Nyepo

At the border to Moyo, there is a remarkable landmark called Jale Hill. It is a historically renowned hill which is known to both the Kuku and their Ma'di neighbours.

== Culture ==
=== Language ===
The Kuku people speak a very similar language to some of the other Karo groups in South Sudan like the Bari tribe. They speak the Bari language which originated from the Bari tribe. Their script was developed when the British colonized Sudan. They write using the Latin alphabet. In addition, they have a few other letters, and some letters familiar to English are omitted. Some letters that are not included like F and C. In their language, anything you pronounce has its own way of saying it. The way you pronounce it is totally unique according to the tribe.

Alphabet: A E I O U Ö – B D G J K L – M N P R S T – W Y 'B 'D Ý Ŋ – NY GB KP (capitals)

Words and meanings:

- Good Morning- Do a puré
- Good Evening- Do a parana
- Water- Piyong
- Come Here- Puo ni

They only use good morning during morning hours till noon and good evening through the afternoon till night.

Names that are given to a newborn child have many different meanings. The name of the first child is decided by the father unless he says otherwise.

=== Religious beliefs ===
The Kuku agricultural lifestyle is reflected in their religious belief and practices. They strongly believe that there is only one God and he lives somewhere above the skies. In practice, they believe that all happenings to a family, a clan or the whole tribe take place as a result of their deeds. God, who is merciful and kind, speaks and acts to the people through their ancestors. The word for God in Kuku language is Ŋun and for man is ŋuto analyzed as Ŋutu or separated into two words as Ŋu tu. The word tu in Kuku means exact. Ŋutu then gives the meaning of exact image of God. Ŋun is invisible and therefore speaks and acts to the people in spirit. The Kuku people believe that Ŋun sends strong messages to the people through the spirits of their ancestors. The word for Spirit in Kuku language is Mulökötyo. There are two types of spirits, good and bad. Good spirits are called Mulökö Lo'but٫ and bad or evil spirits are called Mulökö Lorok.

- Mulökö Lo'but: speak and act to the people (grand children) by good messages of blessings like saving members of the family, clan or the tribe from disastrous moments. They bring sufficient rain at the right time of sowing food crops.
- Mulökö Lorok: do the opposite. They speak and act with bad messages of punishment to the grandchildren, like bringing sickness or even death to a family, clan or the tribe. They stop rain at the time of sowing food crops. Under this influence Kuku have maintained a strong family tree to keep them as close to Ŋun (God). In Kuku belief, you can only receive the Grace of God through your ancestral line, and that's if you have been doing good and follow their teachings.

With the penetration of Christianity missionary activity into southern Sudan, the Kuku traditional belief and religious lifestyle have been replaced with many Western Christian traditions.

=== Art forms ===
There are different types of dances performed by the Kuku tribe. Young members of the tribe often do a rain dance when there is a drought. Elders sometimes participate when they really want/need to. There are dances of mourning during funerals. Family members of the deceased abstain from dancing to show their grief. After a bountiful harvest, the whole community gathers and dances to show their happiness and thanks to the Spirits and God.

They make baskets from reeds and long grasses that they obtain from the landscape around them. They rarely use color for decoration in their tribe. Other handicrafts include making containers from gourds or other big fruits and from animal skin.

The Kuku are very fond of songs. They create songs for all kinds of subjects. Each and every song expresses a certain intense feeling. Most of the songs are based on true stories. For them, anything can be made into a song. While story-telling, the Kuku largely use animals as characters in their stories. Elders are often the ones who tell these stories to the children.

For housing, they get bamboo from the mountains for their roofing and thatch it with grass. The walls are made from mud taken from an anti hill and neatly speared with soil taken from a river back to help keep the temperature cool inside.

For clothing today, they use modern Western clothing. Previously, they used fiber from trees that is flattened out and then wrapped around their bodies. They also used animal skin as clothing. They only used to cover the necessary parts of the body, like their midsection. They walked around barefoot. During special occasions, some of them wear a cow tail on their wrists for style. Sometimes, they wear feathers on their heads. The feathers come from a variety of birds, and the type or quantity worn shows status. Earrings for women are made using pieces of scrap metal.

For body art, men and women have a choice to burn a scar onto their body in a design they desire. Scarification is a personal choice and not an obligation. It is done as body decoration for others to admire.

=== Social behavior ===
The Kuku play a game that is very similar to baseball called wuri. It involves hitting a hard fruit with a stick and running. The rules are exactly the same as baseball.

Elders play a game that they play on the ground. They make many indents and then use rocks (small gravels) as characters in their games. The game is called soroo.

Children stay away from elders as a sign of respect. They are not supposed to talk with them at all. During some occasions, parents/adults will invite elders to come to their home for dinner.

After or during good rains, the whole community comes together to celebrate. The same can be said for harvests.

There are not strict working hours in Kuku society. People can take a break when they desire and at any time of the day.

The Kuku have a special drink called yawanatakbe. It is an alcoholic drink made from sorghum. They eat foods like beans and meat every day. Their first meal is usually at 7 in the morning, Lunch at around mid-day and dinner in the evening.

When it comes time for a young man to be married, a family will go to a neighboring community and get information about a girl in another family that is old enough to get married. If her personality and reputation is acceptable, a dowry (usually a pre-determined number of animals) is paid to the bride's family. The couple then are declared married by the elders. The couple will go and make a new house and stay there together, or the wife will go and stay with her husband in his parents' house.

When a child is born, the community comes together and celebrates the new addition.

After a person has died, the people are always gloomy, especially the family. They bury the deceased and then have a community meeting to bless the person and give him or her a good life with the spirits and God. They bury after two or three days normally. They talk about the cause of death with the relatives. If they come to a decision, the person is buried. This ceremony lasts for about a week.

=== Social structure ===
Men normally go hunting and farming during the day. Women spend most of the day working at farming and other chores. The women come home one hour earlier than men to start preparing the meal for the day. Young boys and girls are free to play and often assist in chores around the home. Occasionally, a father will take his son to teach him how to hunt and farm. A mother teaches her daughters how to do household chores. Adults, in general, must work very hard as a community to help the village to survive. Elders keep the law and order in the tribe/community.

In the village, the highest respect goes to the elders, then male adults, followed by adult women, and lastly, the children.

A person is viewed highly if he has a wealth of money or animals, or if he has many children or wives. Others respect him because having a large family means that you have enough wealth to care for a large number of people. The importance of a person in a community is normally attributed to their wealth (puet), how they have helped the community, or their age.

For a spouse to be chosen it takes a very long time and there are a lot of procedures. First, the groom's family goes to another community and finds a girl with a good background and personality. If the groom has a bad reputation, he goes very far to find a bride. Then the bride's family usually decides to go to the groom's village and find out information about the groom's family, to learn about their status in the community. If the family of the bride agrees, they are officially married. The girl would normally say yes to show respect. Previously, girls did not have a say in who they want to marry.

=== Institutions ===
A family unit in the tribe normally consisted of a husband and one wife with children. Extended families live in separate housing. The average number of children is seven to twelve. Wives could be as many as the husband desired, but it was limited by his ability to care for them and provide the dowries. Since the arrival of Christianity, marriage has become monogamous. The father is always the leader of the family, and if he is gone, the first wife is then in charge of the family.

At first, the people of Kuku beliefs were pantheistic and often worshiped a river or a big tree in their village. People would go to these places whenever there was a need and they prayed to the rain God to give them water. Religion was not formal or important because they wanted to believe in something that would help them. As time has passed, most Kuku are Christians and now pray on a daily basis.

In the community, most decisions are made by the elders, and solutions depend on the situation. If another group comes and raids or attacks their group, they will fight back to get back what was lost. In some situations, all the elders will come together and discuss an appropriate solution. If a law is broken, the person who commits the crime must pay a number of animals to the family or tribe that was offended. If a person has committed murder, he must pay seven cows, four goats and five sheep. This will be given to the family of the deceased.

Community rules include-

1. Respect to all
2. No stealing
3. No adultery
4. No poison (no killing in other words)
5. No discrimination
6. No tribalism

All children are supposed to be taught by their parents. They teach about life and what they should do for a good life. Before being colonized, moral education was the most important. There was no formal schooling prior to colonization. Children were taught at home. "To know what to do in life is always the most important feeling in life."

== Economic base ==
The economy is almost entirely agricultural. Most live on farms in the village, but some become artisans like blacksmiths or potters. Wealth is largely measured in the number of animals. Other products that are made are spears, knives, gourds, drums, flutes, and guitars.

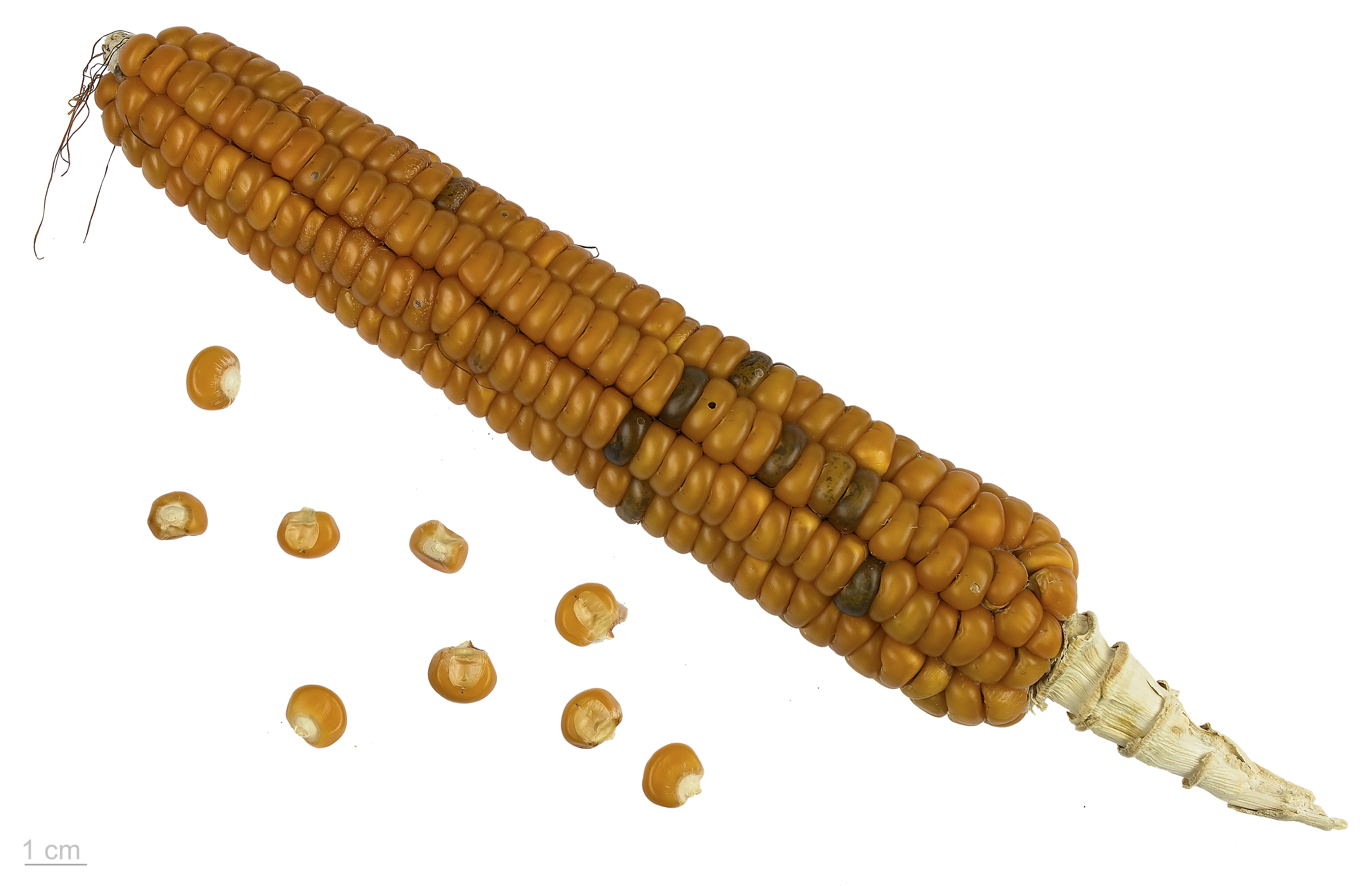
Maize ( Leseri/ Mbaya)

Crops consist of sorghum (masika), maize (Liserit), rice (rusu), millet, and other grains. Most other items are normally gathered from the bush. They also care for cattle, sheep, and goats. The Kuku agricultural lifestyle is reflected in their religious belief and practices. They strongly believe that there is only one God and he lives somewhere above the skies. In practice, they believe that all happenings to a family, a clan or the whole tribe take place as a result of their deeds. God, who is merciful and kind, speaks and acts to the people through their ancestors. The word for God in Kuku language is Ŋun and for man is ŋuto analyzed as Ŋutu or separated into two words as Ŋu tu. The word tu in Kuku means exact. Ŋutu then gives the meaning of exact image of God. Ŋun is invisible and therefore speaks and acts to the people in spirit. The Kuku people believe that Ŋun sends strong messages to the people through the spirits of their ancestors. The word for Spirit in Kuku language is Mulökötyo. There are two types of spirits, good and bad. Good spirits are called Mulökö Lo'but٫ and bad spirits are called Mulökö Lorok.

- Mulökö Lo'but: speak and act to the people (grand children) by good messages of blessings, like saving members of the family, clan or the tribe from disastrous moments. They bring sufficient rain at the right time of sowing food crops.
- Mulökö Lorok: do the opposite. They speak and act with bad messages of punishment to the grand children, like bringing sickness or even death to a family, clan or the tribe. They stop rain at the time of sowing food crops. Under this influence, Kuku have maintained a strong family tree to keep them as close to Ŋun (God). In Kuku belief, you can only receive the Grace of God through your ancestral line, and that's if you have been doing good and follow their teachings.

With the penetration of Christianity missionary activity into southern Sudan, the Kuku traditional belief and religious lifestyle have been replaced with many Western Christian traditions.

=== Art forms ===
There are different types of dances performed by the Kuku tribe. Young members of the tribe often do a rain dance when there is a drought. Elders sometimes participate when they really want/need to. There are dances of mourning during funerals. Family members of the deceased abstain from dancing to show their grief. After a bountiful harvest, the whole community gathers and dances to show their happiness and thanks to the Spirits and God.

They make baskets from reeds and long grasses that they obtain from the landscape around them. They rarely use color for decoration in their tribe. Other handicrafts include making containers from gourds or other big fruits and from animal skin.

The Kuku are very fond of songs. They create songs for all kinds of subjects. Each and every song expresses a certain intense feeling. Most of the songs are based on true stories. For them, anything can be made into a song. While storytelling, the Kuku largely use animals as characters in their stories. Elders are often the ones who tell these stories to the children.

For housing, they get bamboo from the mountains for their roofing and thatch it with grass. The walls are made from mud taken from an anti hill and neatly speared with soil taken from a river back to help keep the temperature cool inside.

For clothing today, they use modern Western clothing. Previously, they used fiber from trees that is flattened out and then wrapped around their bodies. They also used animal skin as clothing. They only used to cover the necessary parts of the body, like their midsection. They walked around barefoot. During special occasions, some of them wear a cow tail on their wrists for style. Sometimes, they wear feathers on their heads. The feathers come from a variety of birds, and the type or quantity worn shows status. Earrings for women are made using pieces of scrap metal.

For body art, men and women have a choice to burn a scar onto their bodies in a design they desire. Scarification is a personal choice and not an obligation. It is done as body decoration for others to admire.

=== Social behavior ===
The Kuku play a game that is very similar to baseball called wuri. It involves hitting a hard fruit with a stick and running. The rules are exactly the same as baseball.

Elders play a game that they play on the ground. They make many indents and then use rocks (small gravel) as characters in their games. The game is called soroo.

Children stay away from elders as a sign of respect. They are not supposed to talk with them at all. On some occasions, parents/adults will invite elders to come to their home for dinner.

After or during good rains, the whole community comes together to celebrate. The same can be said for harvests.

There are not strict working hours in Kuku society. People can take a break when they desire and at any time of the day.

The Kuku have a special drink called yawanatakbe. It is an alcoholic drink made from sorghum. They eat foods like beans and meat every day. Their first meal is usually at 7 in the morning, Lunch at around mid-day and dinner in the evening.

When it comes time for a young man to be married, a family will go to a neighboring community and get information about a girl in another family who is old enough to get married. If her personality and reputation is acceptable, a dowry (usually a pre-determined number of animals) is paid to the bride's family. The couple was then declared married by the elders. The couple will go and make a new house and stay there together, or the wife will go and stay with her husband in his parents' house.

When a child is born, the community comes together and celebrates the new addition.

After a person has died, the people are always gloomy, especially the family. They bury the deceased and then have a community meeting to bless the person and give him or her a good life with the spirits and God. They bury after two or three days normally. They talk about the cause of death with the relatives. If they come to a decision, the person is buried. This ceremony lasts for about a week.

=== Social structure ===
Men normally go hunting and farming during the day. Women spend most of the day working on farming and other chores. The women come home one hour earlier than the men to start preparing the meal for the day. Young boys and girls are free to play and often assist in chores around the home. Occasionally, a father will take his son to teach him how to hunt and farm. A mother teaches her daughters how to do household chores. Adults, in general, must work very hard as a community to help the village survive. Elders keep the law and order in the tribe/community.

In the village, the highest respect goes to the elders, then male adults, followed by adult women, and lastly, the children.

A person is viewed highly if he has a wealth of money or animals, or if he has many children or wives. Others respect him because having a large family means that you have enough wealth to care for a large number of people. The importance of a person in a community is normally attributed to their wealth (puet), how they have helped the community, or their age.

For a spouse to be chosen, it takes a long time and there are a lot of procedures. First, the groom's family goes to another community and finds a girl with a good background and personality. If the groom has a bad reputation, he goes very far to find a bride. Then the bride's family usually decides to go to the groom's village and find out information about the groom's family, to learn about their status in the community. If the family of the bride agrees, they are officially married. The girl would normally say yes to show respect. In the old days, the girl did not have a say in who she wanted to marry. If the guy were rich, he could have any girl he wanted. If she resists, she is kidnapped by her husband. Now, there has to be a yes on both sides for a marriage to happen.

=== Institutions ===
A family unit in the tribe normally consisted of a husband and two wives with children. Extended families live in separate housing. The average number of children is seven. Wives could be as many as the husband desired, but it was limited by his ability to care for them and provide the dowry. Since the arrival of Christianity, marriage has become monogamous. The father is always the leader of the family, and if he is gone, the first wife is then in charge of the family.

At first, the Kuku people's beliefs were pantheistic and they often worshiped a river or a big tree in their village. People would go to these places whenever there was a need and they prayed to the rain God to give them water. Religion was not formal or important because they wanted to believe in something that would help them. As time has passed, most Kuku are Christians and now pray on a daily basis.

In the community, most decisions are made by the elders, and solutions depend on the situation. If another group comes and raids or attacks their group, they will fight back to get back what was lost. In some situations, all the elders will come together and discuss an appropriate solution. If a law is broken, the person who commits the crime must pay a number of animals to the family or tribe that was offended. If a person has committed murder, he must pay seven cows, four goats and five sheep. This will be given to the family of the deceased.

Community rules include-

1. Respect to all
2. No stealing
3. No adultery

All children are supposed to be taught by their parents. They teach about life and what they should do for a good life. Before being colonized, moral education was the most important. There was no formal schooling prior to colonization. Children were taught at home. "To know what to do in life is always the most important feeling in life."
