= Kuku dialect =

Nilotic language

Kuku
- Region: South Sudan and Uganda
- Ethnicity: Kuku people
- Native speakers: 200,000 (2014)
- Language family: Nilo-Saharan?: Eastern Sudanic?; Kir–Abbaian?; Nilotic; Eastern Nilotic; Bari; Kuku

Language codes
- ISO 639-3: ukv
- Glottolog: kuku1285

The Kuku dialect, also called Kutuk na Kuku (Kuku language), belongs to the Karo language group, of the Southeastern Nilotic branch of the Nilotic language family of Southern Sudan and Northern Uganda. There is no standardized writing system for Kuku; it is sometimes written using the alphabet of a related language such as Bari or Kakwa, with the addition of characters to represent sounds that are not present in the other language. For example, the Bari alphabet can be adjusted for use in Kuku by adding the digraphs gb and kp to represent the voiced and voiceless labiovelar stops, respectively.

The Kuku alphabet, which has two digraphs not found in the Bari alphabet, runs as follows:

A E I O U Ö – B D G J K L – M N P R S T – W Y ’B ’D ’Y Ŋ – NY GB KP

a e i o ö – b d g j k l – m n p r s t – w y ’b ’d ’y ŋ – ny gb kp

Kuku is a tone language. It has agglutinative verbal morphology, with extensive suppletion. Nouns are divided into two genders. There is a vowel harmony system that primarily involves an ATR distinction. Differences between Kuku and Bari include the phoneme inventory, pronouns, tonal phonology, and tense formation. The most striking difference may be in the function of the qualitative morpheme, which is used to indicate a definite/indefinite contrast in Bari, but indicates an aspectual contrast in Kuku. Kuku language have a variety of borrowed words. some words are of Kisawahili, and Arabic language that are altered a little to sound different. Today a number of words seem to be derived from English too by the more educated Kuku people. More educated Kuku people mix the language with some English in it mostly for example if they want to say "you are not serious" they say "Do mb'an sirias".

== Music ==
The traditional folk songs of the Kuku people are Bula and Kore. The songs are sung and traditional drums and the horn are played as instruments. The dance include shuffling of feet and stumping for the Bula, and some form of rhythmic jumping for the Kore.

Modern music is also common among the Kuku. Due to the many years of the civil war, the culture is heavily influenced by the countries neighboring South Sudan. Most Kuku fled to Kenya and Uganda where they interacted with the nationals and learnt their languages and culture. For most of those who remained in the country, or went North to Sudan and Egypt, they greatly assimilated Arabic culture.

It is also worth noting that most Kuku kept the core of their culture even while in exile and diaspora. Traditional culture is highly upheld and a great focus is given to knowing one's origin and dialect. Although the common languages spoken are Arabi Juba and English, Kuku is the unifying language. Many music artists from Central Equatoria use English, Kiswahili, Arabi Juba, their Kuku or a mix of all.

Popular artists from Kuku are like Reflections BYG, a beautiful fresh voice rocking the Zouk floor with her first single Ng'ume which means Smile received high hits in the first few days of its release. She has an amazing strong voice for the popular Jazz as well as Afrobeat and Hip Hop; De-vine Is a new songstress from the same county of Kajo Keji singing R&B and Zouk. Although the women are underrepresented, these two talents are putting the state back on the charts. Emmanuel Lasu is one of the popular male talent that central Equatoria has produced.

== Other Readings ==
- Voßen, Rainer, The Eastern Nilotes. Linguistics and Historical Reconstructions, Kölner Beiträge zur Afrikanistik n° 9, Berlin: Dietrich Reimer Verlag, 1982. ISBN 3-496-00698-6
- (in Japanese) 飛内悠子, 私の研究とその社会的意義, グローバル・スタディーズ研究科地域研究専攻博士前期課程, available at http://www.st.sophia.ac.jp/T.de.Chardin/pdf/08_hiuchi.pdf (Masters thesis on language use in Sudan with a particular focus on Kuku)
