= Bari people =

Ethnic group of South Sudan

Bari
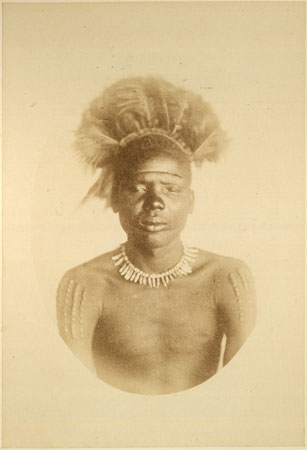

Total population
- c. 739,000; or c. 624,000

Regions with significant populations
- South Sudan

Languages
- Bari language

Religion
- Traditional African religion Christianity; Islam

Related ethnic groups
- other Nilotic peoples, esp. the Pojulu, the Kakwa, the Nyangwara, the Mundari, and the Kuku

The Bari are a tribe of Karo, Nilotic people inhabiting South Sudan. The Bari speak the Bari language as a mother tongue, which belongs to the Nilotic family.

== Overview ==
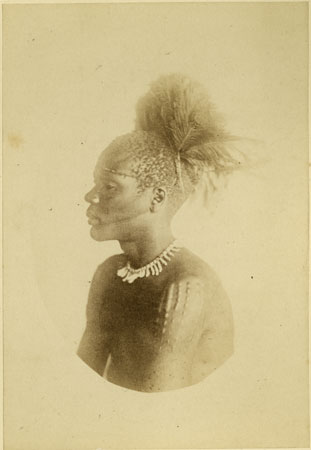
Late 1870s portrait of Bari man with tribal scarification

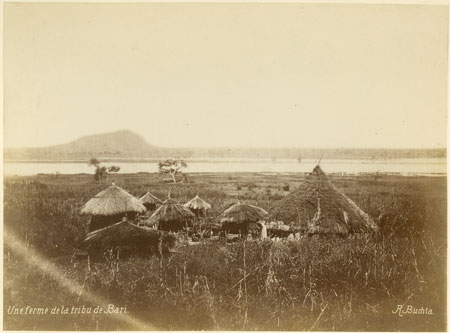
Bari homestead late 1870s

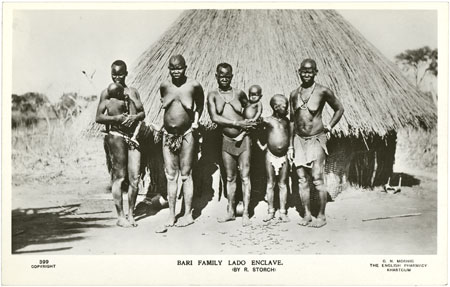

The Bari of the Nile are sedentary agropastoralists. They exploit the savanna lands along the river Nile, and up to 40 miles east and west of the Nile. Their economy is based on subsistence mixed farming; their domestic livestock (small and large) are mainly raised for supplementing food, but mostly as a socio-economic and financial investment. Notably, livestock are exchanged as gifts in marriages, and other social functions, or sacrificed in celebrations, and funerals; and whenever the need arises they are sold for cash.

The Bari used to own large herds of cattle, but due to being victims of destructive slave raids which caused the spread of the tsetse fly, they have far fewer cattle than in the past.

The Bari are consistently under pressure: now from modern urbanization annexing their green lands and infusing different cultures into their lifestyles; and historically, the Baris have been devastated by slave traders and forced by Belgians (especially from the Lado Enclave) into labor camps and used as porters to carry ivory tusks to the Atlantic coast. The two Sudanese Civil Wars (1955–1973; 1983–2005) have also affected the Bari social, economic and financial dynamics.

War (intertribal or resisting foreigners) is not alien to Bari history. Generally, the Bari have co-existed well with the neighboring ethnic groups, but have had to pick up arms to defend their land against slave traders and plundering warriors. There is documentation of Bari resistance against invasion by Dinka, Azande (Zande), and numerous encounters with Turkish slave traders.

In the past, it was a fashion among the Bari to undergo initiation ceremonies. Both boys and girls subjected themselves to the removal of lower front teeth. The girls, in addition, got scarifications: around the belly area, the flank, the back, and the face (on the temple) in the form of arrow shapes, or simple flowers.

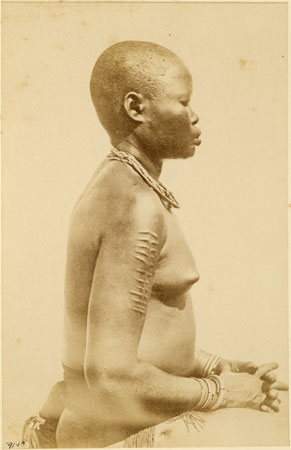
Bari girl with scarification

Along the banks of the Nile, in the heart of the Bari land, lies the historical villages of Mongalla, Lado, Gondokoro (Kondokoro), and Rejaf (Rageef). The capital city of South Sudan, the town of Juba, is also in the Bari land, situated ten miles to the south of Gondokoro, and seven miles to the north of Rejaf.

== Social organization ==
The Bari have a caste system of two groups, the "lui" (freemen) and the "dupi" (serfs). The lui were the chiefs and the fathers of the soil while the lower caste, dupi, were people captured during a war from other tribes, and those who had a trade such as iron smelting, ironmonging, or fishing. The dupi were a hereditary class of serfs who had to give their services to the lui. The lui represented the superior cattle owning element of Bari society.

== Origin ==
Based on Bari folklore, their history dates back to the 15th century when the Bari came from the north. Some places in southern Dinkaland still retain Bari names, which indicate those areas were previously home to the Bari until the Dinka arrived and the Bari fled southwards. The Bari probably arrived in their current location in the 1650s or the early 18th century.

Oral history recounts that when they arrived in their present homeland from the north, they found a group, the Pari people, there and drove them away.

== Slavery ==
Since their arrival in the new land, the Bari have been plagued by war and conflict, especially from slave raiders and Azande. Even before the 19th century, the Arabs and Turks involved in the ivory trade raided slaves from the Bari to supply the domestic needs of their home communities and to sell them in the markets of Northern Sudan and beyond.

The second expedition to discover the source of the White Nile entered the Bari lands on 24 January 1841. However, with this progress in the quest for knowledge came undesirable invaders in the form of European and Turkish traders looking for slaves and ivory. This was the first time Bari encountered Europeans travellers. The Bari were lucky in this encounter, as the Turkish army assigned to protect the Nile explorers behaved, unlike the brutality they unleashed on the ethnic groups (Mondari, Dinka, Shilluk) to the north of the Bari, Pojulu, Kakwa to the south and Kuku to the south-east. However, subsequent expeditions were different.

The third expedition (1841–42) to discover the source of the White Nile also discovered that ivory was abundant in the Bari area. The rush for ivory tusks in the White Nile valley then escalated. Initially, both European and Arab traders began sponsoring trips to Gondokoro for ivory. And for a decade the Bari freely sold ivory tusks and other artefacts to the traders without intimidation, and no incidents of slavery were reported by that point.

In April 1854, the peaceful relationship between the traders/explorers and the Bari came to an end when a Turkish trader, without provocation, fired his guns into a crowd of Bari at Gondokoro. Accordingly, the Bari mounted a counterattack that was devastating to both sides. Subsequent to this, the Bari became defensive and less friendly, and the traders (mostly Arabs and Turks) resorted to violent means to procure ivory tusks but also started taking people (young men and women) as slaves. Girls were raped or taken as wives by force. Some of the merchants even built fortified depots near Gondokoro where people were kept awaiting shipment down the White Nile.

During this time, Chief Gubek lo Gore and his son, 'Doggale lo Gubek, of Rejaf East were killed by the Turks army. The Turks army had advanced to attack the village of Rejaf East to take the people as slaves. Chief Gubek was told of the impending attack. He advised his people to go and hide in the bushes. When the Turks army attacked at dawn, there was no one in the village, except Chief Gubek and his son, 'Doggale. The army asked Gubek as to where the people of his village were. Chief Gubek told them that he did not know. The Turks army continued upstream to the villages of Loggo, Nyongki, Sindiru, and Lo'bonok. On their way, creating havoc, raping women, killing those who resisted them and capturing others. They were told by some people that Chief Gubek had sent his people into hiding. When the Turks army returned, taking a huge number of captured people to Gondokoro to be shipped to Khartoum, they beheaded Gubek and his son, 'Doggale. Gubek was from the Dung Kaliri clan.

After the death of Gubek lo Gore and his son, 'Doggale lo Gubek, Nyarsuk lo Gore, his brother, became the chief of Kolye. Presently, Philip Jada, also called Nyarsuk, is the chief, combining Loggo and Kolye. He is the great grandson of Nyarsuk lo Gore. Philip has his sons James Loro, Thomas Lodu Gubek, and others.

In the family of Gubek lo Gore were 'Doggale who married Poni na Lugor of Sindiru. Their son was Yugusuk, also called Loro Gwetele. Yugusuk was the same age as Jada Belendeke of Kolye West. Yugusuk married Maryatha Wosuk na Jore, the daughter of Wani Wonggor, whose children were Mario Jada (Gubek), Alisandro Loku, Daniel Wani, Karlina Kiden, and Entilya Poni.

Chief Philip Jada took over from Chief Alisandro Loku, whose sons include Jada Yengkopiong, also called Gubek and Mathias Wani, the sons of Bernadetta Juka, the granddaughter of Chief Jada Matat of Loggo.

Diaries of European missionaries in the region indicate that in the market of Cairo (Egypt), the number of slaves to be sold to Europe from the White Nile area increased from 6,000 between 1858 and 1862, to approximately 12,000-15,000 per annum. These numbers reflected mostly Bari, Dinka and Mundari, but also included people of other ethnic groups neighboring the Bari, and beyond were hunting for elephant tusks was intense during that time. By 1863, when Sir Samuel White Baker arrived at Gondokoro, also on an expedition to discover the sources of the Nile, boats of buccaneers (even one flying an American flag) were anchoring at Gondokoro with the sole purpose of picking up slaves to the New World. By 1865 about 3000 slaves at any one time could be found waiting at Gondokoro to be carried down the Nile.

Baker returned in 1869 with the express purpose of stamping out the slave trade. By this time, the Bari people and land were already devastated. Bari folklore tells us of how long ago the land flanking the Nile was full of strings of villages spread out to the horizon, as far as the eye could see. Baker concurs, in his book "Ismailia" (1874), that this had been so when he first visited the area. However he describes how, by the time of his next expedition, the slave traders had reduced the Bari villages to a miserable few. Neither could he obtain co-operation from the Bari, who had been persuaded by Abou Saood, the chief slaver of Agad and Company, who had a government monopoly for trade and slaving, that it was in their best interests to help the slavers and hinder Baker.

The Bari were further ravaged in their encounter with Baker and his team.

Ever since then, recovery has been difficult, considering also the fact that the civil wars in 1955-1973 and 1983-2005 have further taken their toll on the Bari.

== Courtship and marriage ==
In the past, it was not uncommon for the Bari to use intermarriage to form bonds between two families. Although these arrangements were sometimes made when the children were very young, the bride price was not necessarily paid until the betrothed children reached marrying age. Today, marriage among the Bari more often involves a period of courtship followed by consent of the families involved.

After a period of courtship, the male suitor usually declares his intent to marry (nyara in Bari) by presenting himself at the house of the girl's parents, accompanied by a few close relatives and friends. Before the wedding ceremony (budu, typically several months later), the families meet in the bride's parents' house to negotiate the bride price that the bridegroom is obligated to offer; the parents of the bride and bridegroom are never directly involved in these negotiations, though they may be involved indirectly and behind the scenes. Because the Bari have long been agro-pastoralists, the bride price is traditionally paid in the form of live animals. A typical bride price might be composed of two dozen cattle, 40 head of sheep and goats. When the use of animals is too difficult, such as in the case of drought or natural disaster, bride prices in the form of cash may also be acceptable. Behaviors considered disrespectful may increase the bride price during negotiations (though it is also possible for civil courts to get involved); these can include premarital sex, eloping, and aggression towards in-laws. Once the negotiations are successful, both families bless the marriage and commence in a feast that involves drinking and dancing. After the feast, the bridegroom returns home alone, but after about two weeks, the bride arrives to take charge of her house.

For Bari who have converted to Christianity, an additional step occurs wherein the marriage also receives a church blessing. Ideally, this would occur before the husband and wife begin living together. However, because of the financial burden of having both a Bari traditional wedding feast and a Christian wedding ceremony, the trend has been to first have the traditional feast and then put off the Christian wedding for a year or longer while the couple saves up money for the occasion. This can be problematic when couples do not also wait to have children, which may be perceived as producing children out of wedlock. While the Second Vatican Council (1962–65) declaration opened the door for adaptation of some African traditional practices into the church, this has not yet led to the formation of a single wedding ceremony for Bari Christians.

== Bari religion ==
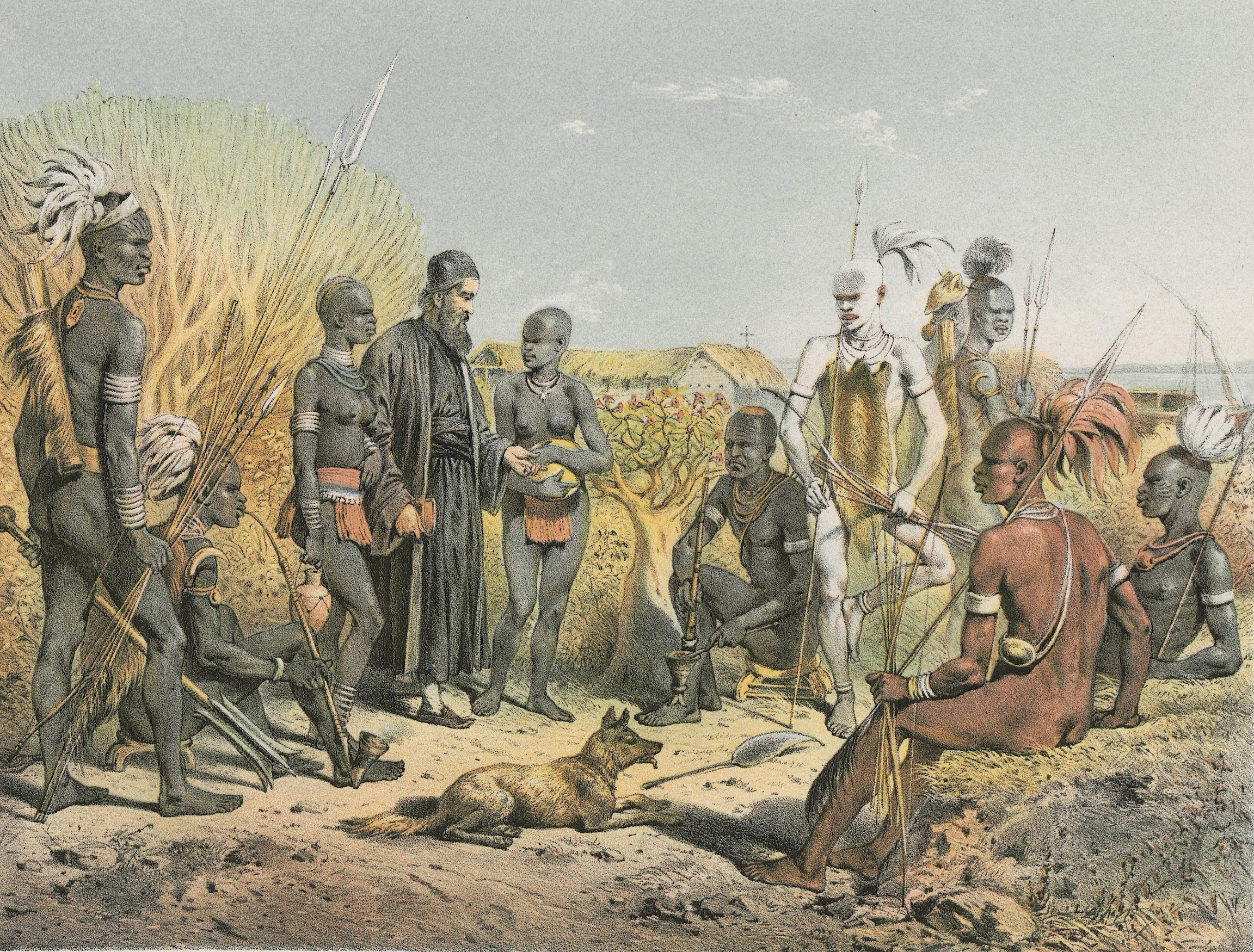
A group of Bari talking with a European misisonary, c. 1860

Many Bari combine aspects of their traditional religion with Christianity, which the majority of Bari today follow. They believe in one almighty God and the existence of powerful spirits (good and evil). Some still worship solely the traditional gods, one of which is nameless and has two different sides. Half of this god lives in the sky and brings forth rain and the other half of this god lives in the ground and encourages growth in agriculture. They also have many cultural heroes, such as Sabaseba, who is known as "Old Wind." The elders in the village were valued for their knowledge of gods such as these.

Nun, a supernatural power, is found in big, strong trees. Tribe members would stuff the tree bark with tobacco leaves and on occasion, blood and fat from animals were put upon the tree bark as well. The Bari would pray while anointing the tree, and they believed that Nun would visit at night to feast on the offerings. The Nun goes by different names, and each name is associated with a different personality. The Nun-loki is the most benevolent and forgiving, and when he came, he would stop the life of whoever he thought had lived long enough. Nun-lukak was known as the "spirit of food" and prayers to him would result in a plentiful growing season. If prayer did not work, then a sacrifice would be made.

The Bari will make small animal sacrifices to the spirits of the dead, and that by doing so, when they die they will move onto the next life in the horizon, which is very much like their first one.

The Bari believe that the world is made up of levels and that the plane they live on now is in the middle. They believe that they are surrounded by beings that live in the water, in the air, on the earth, and in their villages.

When the Bari visited members of another tribe, there would be a ceremony that took place that involved singing and chanting and swinging back and forth on hammocks. The men would swing in hammocks placed closer to the ceiling, while the women would swing on hammocks that hung lower to the ground. They would also exchange gifts with members of the same gender. The gifts had to be of equal value to each other, so men often exchanged arrows or arrowheads while the women would exchange articles of clothing, primarily woven skirts.

== Literature ==
- Crabites, Pierre. Gordon, The Sudan and Slavery Greenwood Press, 1970. ISBN 0-8371-1764-X
- Northrup, David. Beyond the Bend in the River: African Labor in Eastern Zaire, 1865-1940 Ohio University Center for International Studies, 1988. ISBN 0-89680-151-9
- Udal, John O. The Nile in darkness: conquest and exploration, 1504-1862 Michael Russell Publishing, 1998. ISBN 0-85955-238-1
- Speke, John Hanning. Journal of the discovery of the source of the Nile. Edinburgh/London: Blackwood and sons, 1863.
- Seligman, C. G., and Seligman, B. Z., 'Pagan Tribes of the Nilotic Sudan.' George Routledge & Sons Ltd., London, 1932.
- Collins, Robert O., 'Land beyond the Rivers, the Southern Sudan, 1898–1918.' Yale University Press, New Haven and London, 1971.
- Regib Yunis, 'Notes on the Kuku and other minor tribes inhabiting Kajo-Keji District, Mongalla province.' SNR VII (1) 1936 pp 1– 41.
- Peter Rohrbacher: Logwit-lo-Ladú (1848–1866): Seine Bedeutung als afrikanische Gewährsperson in der Frühphase der österreichischen Afrikanistik in: Michel Espagne; Pascale Rabault, David Simo (Hg.), Afrikanische Deutschland-Studien und deutsche Afrikanistik – ein Spiegelbild. Würzburg 2014, 49–72.
