= Karo people (East Africa) =

Group of Eastern Nilotic tribes in East and Central Africa

The Karo is a group of Eastern Nilotic tribes that straddles the Nile in South Sudan and is predominately found in Central Equatoria, and as far South as Uganda and South-West as Democratic Republic of the Congo. Karo comprises Yangwara, Nyepo people [Nyepo], Bari, Pojulu, Kuku, Mundari and Kakwa. They have been erroneously called Bari-speakers by C. G. Seligman, a British ethnologist, whose first contact with Karo was likely with the Bari during British colonial rule in Sudan. Seligman categorised the six ethnic groups as "Bari Speakers" for research purposes as he did so for "Dinka Speakers, Nuer Speakers, Lou Speakers, Moru Speakers and the Azande Speakers". These other groups, however, have not adopted the categorization coined by G. Seligman for ethnic identification. It is only the "Bari Speakers" who are erroneously defined as speakers of Bari language.

The term "Bari-speakers" is not considered representative of the six ethnic groups that occupy the present Central Equatoria Region of Sudan. "Bari Speakers" linguistically connotes speaking of the Bari dialect without being part of the Bari ethnic group. This categorization has tended to alienate people in the Kobura, Yangwara, Pojulu, Kuku, Kakwa and Mundari communities. It was not until July 1986 that a young junior officer of the rank of lieutenant in the Sudan Peoples Liberation Movement/Army, by the name of Lemi Logwonga Lomuro, discovered for himself that the categorization of people as speakers of a language was not only limited to the "Bari Speakers" in the Central Equatoria Region of Sudan. Lt Logwonga realised that his comrades in the SPLM/SPLA from other groups, including the Moru, Nuer, Dinka and the Lou, speak different dialects, yet they are not described as "Speakers" of one of those dialects. The Dinka, for example, speak more than seven dialects and are only known as "Dinka or Jieng", not Dinka speakers. The Nuer, too, speak more than seven dialects. This discovery triggered Lt Logwonga to consult with some of his fellow members of various communities from Central Equatoria in the SPLM/SPLA to promote a common identity for the six groups comprising the Bari, Pojulu, Kuku, Yangwara, Kakwa and Mundari. Initial consultations took place in Bongo SPLA Military Training Centre, where pioneers endorsed the concept of "Karo Community" to unite the people of Central Equatoria, and encouraged Lt Logwonga to continue to pursue such a noble idea. Among those who took interest in the endeavour were 1st Lt. Martin Kenyi Ladu Bara, 1st Lt. Gwido Mori, Lt.Paulino Loku Kedia, Lt. Moses Lubari, Lt. Michael Yokwe Soro, Lt. Moses Arapa Lo-Gune, and Lt. Augustino Luwate. The pioneers advocated for all-inclusive "Karo Community" of people. This idea was to gain ground when in December 2000 General Logwonga introduced the Karo project to Dr. Luka Monoja Tombekana, to solicit for his support in London. Dr Monoja wholeheartedly blessed the initiative and pledged to contribute to its advancement. Since then "Karo" as a unifying identity for the six ethnic groups (stated above) continues to evolve.

"Karo" means "relative" and it appeals to the relatedness of the Karo people. Indeed, there is a broad base movement within Karo to redefine the whole tribal affiliation and groups as Woti Karo or Karo people. Woti Karo share a common culture in addition to language, which has been called Kutuk na Karo ("mother tongue").

== Body Art ==
The Karo are known for their body and face painting. Historically, this has been done with natural materials, like red or yellow ochre, charcoal, iron ore, or white lime, though now white chalk is most commonly used. Generally, with body painting throughout Africa, colors are chosen to highlight skin tone, generally through contrast in color and/or saturation. The Karo people most commonly use white pigment, though sometimes they will use red or yellow pigments on special occasions, the latter usually coinciding with hunting or fighting victories. Though white is most commonly associated with life, death, and religion throughout Africa, cultural variations on color association make it difficult to know the exact associations that the Karo people have with the color. Generally, it is thought that the Karo do their body painting for beautification, though specific patterns can coincide with ceremonies, like the Bula, courtship dances, or harvest festivals.

African body art in general has been categorized by type of pattern, along the lines of dot patterns, line patterns, curved patterns, block patterns, and optical patterns, with Karo designs falling under optical patterns. This means that body art designs frequently depict objects or patterned units that convey symbolic meaning, like repeated shields for safety, or animals before a hun.t The Karo often use dot patterns to symbolize guinea fowl, this usage falling under optical patterns due to their symbolic nature.
