= Karo people =

Karo people may refer to:

- Karo people (East Africa)
- Karo people (Ethiopia)
- Karo people (Indonesia)
