= Mandari dialect =

Eastern Nilotic language of South Sudan

Mandari
- Kir
- Region: South Sudan
- Ethnicity: Mundari
- Native speakers: 70,000 (2014)
- Language family: Nilo-Saharan?: Eastern Sudanic?; Southern Eastern?; Nilotic; Eastern; Bari; Mandari
- Writing system: Latin

Language codes
- ISO 639-3: mqu
- Glottolog: mand1425

Mandari (also written Mundari) is an Eastern Nilotic language spoken by the Mundari people of South Sudan.

== Writing system ==
Mandari alphabet
Uppercase	A	Ä	B	ʼB	D	ʼD	E	Ë	G	I	Ï	J	K	L	M	N
Lowercase	a	ä	b	ʼb	d	ʼd	e	ë	g	i	ï	j	k	l	m	n
Pronunciation in IPA	a	ə	b	ɓ	d	ɗ	ɛ	e	g	ɪ	i	ɟ/d͡ʒ	k	l	m	n
Uppercase	NY	Ŋ	O	Ö	P	R	S	T	U	Ü	W	Y	ʼY	ʼ		
Lowercase	ny	ŋ	o	ö	p	r	s	t	u	ü	w	y	ʼy	ʼ		
Pronunciation in IPA	ɲ	ŋ	ɔ	o	p	r	s	t	ʊ	u	w	j	ʄ	ʔ		

=== Tones ===
- á - [˥]
- à - [˩]
- a - [˧]
- â - [˥˩]
