= Bari language =

Nilotic language spoken in South Sudan and Uganda

Bari
- Barian
- Karo, Kutuk
- Region: South Sudan
- Ethnicity: Karo people
- Speakers: L1: 770,000 (2017); L2: 180,000 (2013)
- Language family: Nilo-Saharan?: Eastern Sudanic; Southern Eastern; Nilotic; Eastern; Bari
- Dialects: Kakwa; Kuku; Mandari
- Writing system: Latin

Language codes
- ISO 639-3: bfa
- Glottolog: bari1283 Barian

Bari is the Nilotic language of the Karo people, spoken over large areas of Central Equatoria state in South Sudan, across the northwest corner of Uganda, and into the Democratic Republic of Congo. Bari is spoken by several distinct tribes: the Bari people themselves, the Pojulu, Kakwa, Nyangwara, Mundari, and Kuku. Each has its own dialect. The language is therefore sometimes called Karo or Kutuk ('mother tongue') rather than Bari.

Bari is a tone language. It has vowel harmony, subject–verb–object word order, and agglutinative verbal morphology with some suppletion. A very competent dictionary and grammar were published in the 1930s, but are very difficult to find today. More recently, a dissertation has been published on Bari tonal phonology, and another dissertation on Bari syntax is available.

== Dialects ==
Dialects are:

- Bari proper (Beri)
- Pöjulu (Pajulu, Fadjulu, Fajelu, Madi)
- Kakwa (Kakua, Kwakwak) [radio broadcasts in Uganda]
- Nyangbara (Nyangwara, Nyambara)
- Mandari (Mondari, Mundari, Chir, Kir, Shir)
- Kuku
- Nyepu (Nyefu, Nyepo, Nypho, Ngyepu)
- Ligo (Liggo)

== Phonology ==
=== Consonants ===
This table is based on Spagnolo (1933).

		Labial	Alveolar	Palatal	Velar	Glottal
Nasal		m	n	ɲ	ŋ	
Plosive	voiceless	p	t		k	ʔ
Plosive	voiced	b	d	ɟ	g	
Implosive		ɓ	ɗ	ʄ		
Fricative			s			(h)
Rhotic			r			
Approximant		w	l	j		

- /ɟ/ may also be heard as an affricate [dʒ] in free variation.
- /l/ can be heard as a flap [ɾ] when in between /u/.

=== Vowels ===
Bari and their kin, the Kakwa, have a cross-height vowel-harmony system.

	+ATR			-ATR		
	Front	Central	Back	Front	Central	Back
Close	i		u	ɪ		ʊ
Mid	e		o	ɛ		ɔ
Open		ɑ̘			a	

== Orthography ==
The Bari alphabet is used by the Bari, Kakwa, Pojulu, and Kuku in South Sudan. There are four digraphs, ʼB, ʼD, ʼY and Ny, and the letter eng, Ŋ.

Bari alphabet
Uppercase	A	B	ʼB	D	ʼD	E	G	J	I	Y	ʼY	K	L	M	N	Ŋ	Ny	O	Ö	P	R	S	T	U	W
Lowercase	a	b	ʼb	d	ʼd	e	g	j	i	y	ʼy	k	l	m	n	ŋ	ny	o	ö	p	r	s	t	u	w

Bari special characters
Uppercase	Ŋ	Ö
Lowercase	ŋ	ö
Alternatives	ng	o
Uppercase Unicode (hexadecimal)	014A	00D6
Lowercase Unicode (hexadecimal)	014B	00F6
Unicode Character Code Chart	Latin Extended A	Latin-1
