= Kakwa people =

Ethnic group

Kakwa
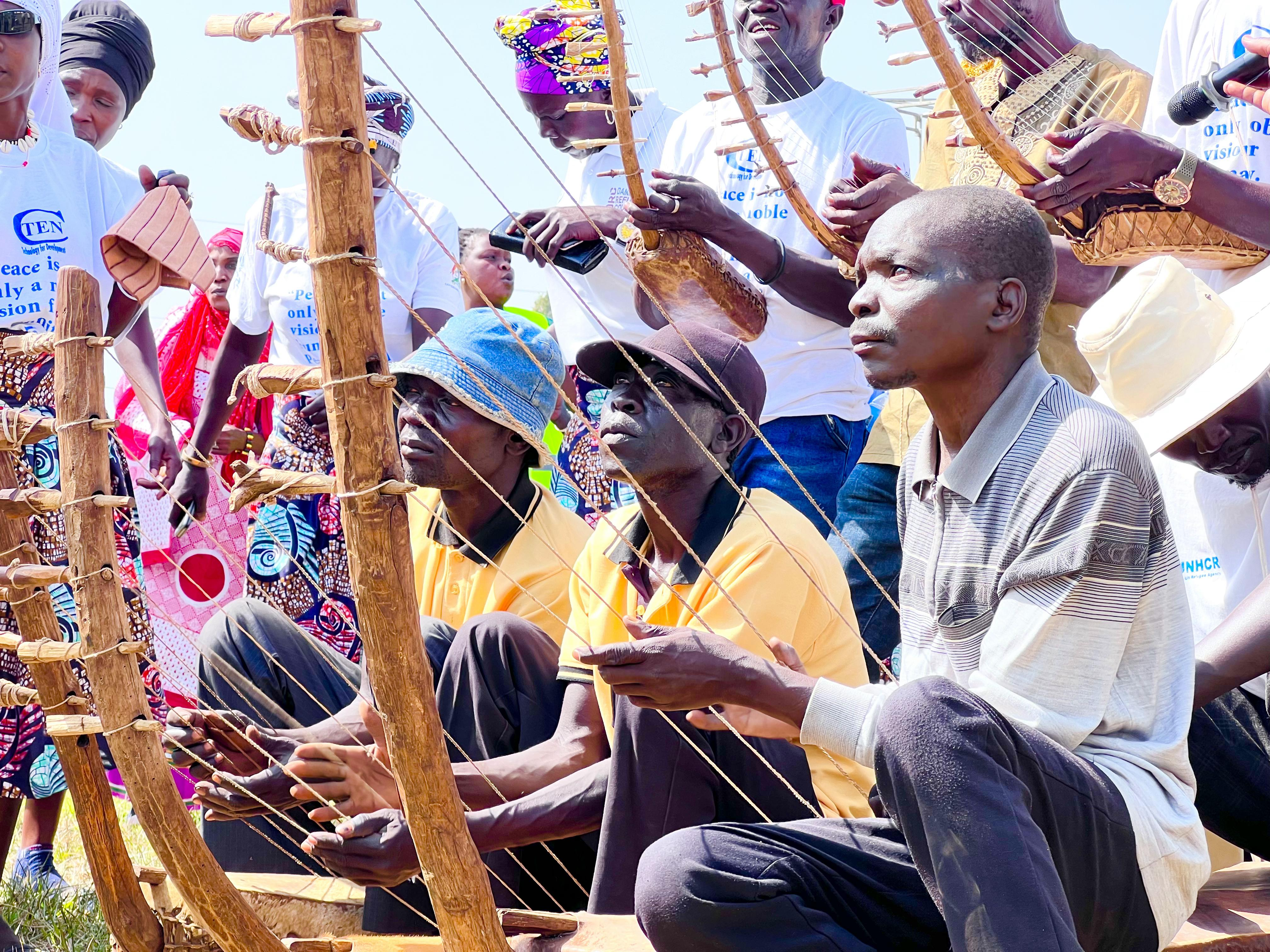
- Kakwa from South Sudan

Total population
- 422,000

Regions with significant populations
- Uganda: 246,000
- South Sudan: 134,000
- DR Congo: 42,000

Languages
- Kakuwâ, English

Religion
- Predominantly: Christianity; Significant minority: Sunni Islam and Animism

Related ethnic groups
- Other Karo people

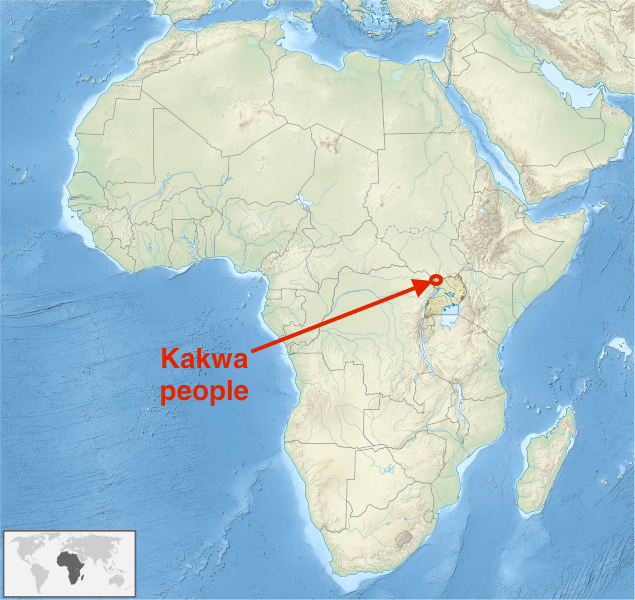
The geographic distribution of the Kakwa people (approx.).

The Kakwa or Kakuwâ are an ethnic group primarily found in the border regions of northwestern Uganda, southwestern South Sudan, and northeastern Democratic Republic of the Congo. They are part of the larger Nilo-Saharan language family, and their traditional homeland spans across these three countries, reflecting both historical and cultural ties in the region.

In Uganda, for example, many Kakwa live in the West Nile region (including districts like Koboko and parts of Arua). In South Sudan, they are present in areas such as Yei River State (formerly part of Central Equatoria State). They can also be found in adjacent areas of the northeastern Democratic Republic of the Congo. Despite political boundaries, the Kakwa people share common linguistic and cultural traditions across these national borders.

The Kakwa people are a Nilotic ethnic group and part of the Karo people found in north-western Uganda, south-western South Sudan, and north-eastern Democratic Republic of the Congo, particularly to the west of the White Nile river.

== Classification and language ==
- Bari
- Pojulu
- Mundari
- Kuku
- Nyangwara
- Ngepo

== Demography ==
The Kakwa people are a small minority but a part of the larger Karo people, an intermarried group that also includes the Bari, Pojulu, Mundari, Kuku, Ngepo, and Nyangwara. Their language, Kutuk na Kakwa, is an Eastern Nilotic language.

They can be found in South Sudan, Uganda, and the Democratic Republic of Congo.

The major towns of the Kakwa people are the town of Yei and Morobo County (South Sudan), Koboko District (Uganda), and Imgbokolo and Aba (Democratic Republic of the Congo). The Kakwa people sometimes refer to themselves as "Kakwa Salia Musala", translated directly as "Kakwa three country's" a phrase they commonly use to denote their 'oneness' in spite of being politically dispersed among three countries.

== History ==
According to the Kakwa oral tradition, they migrated out of East Africa (Nubian region) from the city of Kawa in between the third and fourth cataracts of the Nile. First into South Sudan, and from there southwards into Uganda and the Democratic Republic of Congo. Some of the Kakwa people who bordered Uganda, converted to Islam, accepting the Maliki school of Sunni theology in the medieval era. They were annexed into the Equatoria region claimed by the Egyptian Islamic ruler Khedive Ismail (Isma'ili Pasha) by his descendant Tewfik Pasha in 1889. As the British colonial empire expanded into East Africa and Egypt, the region with Kakwa people became a part of the Uganda Protectorate.

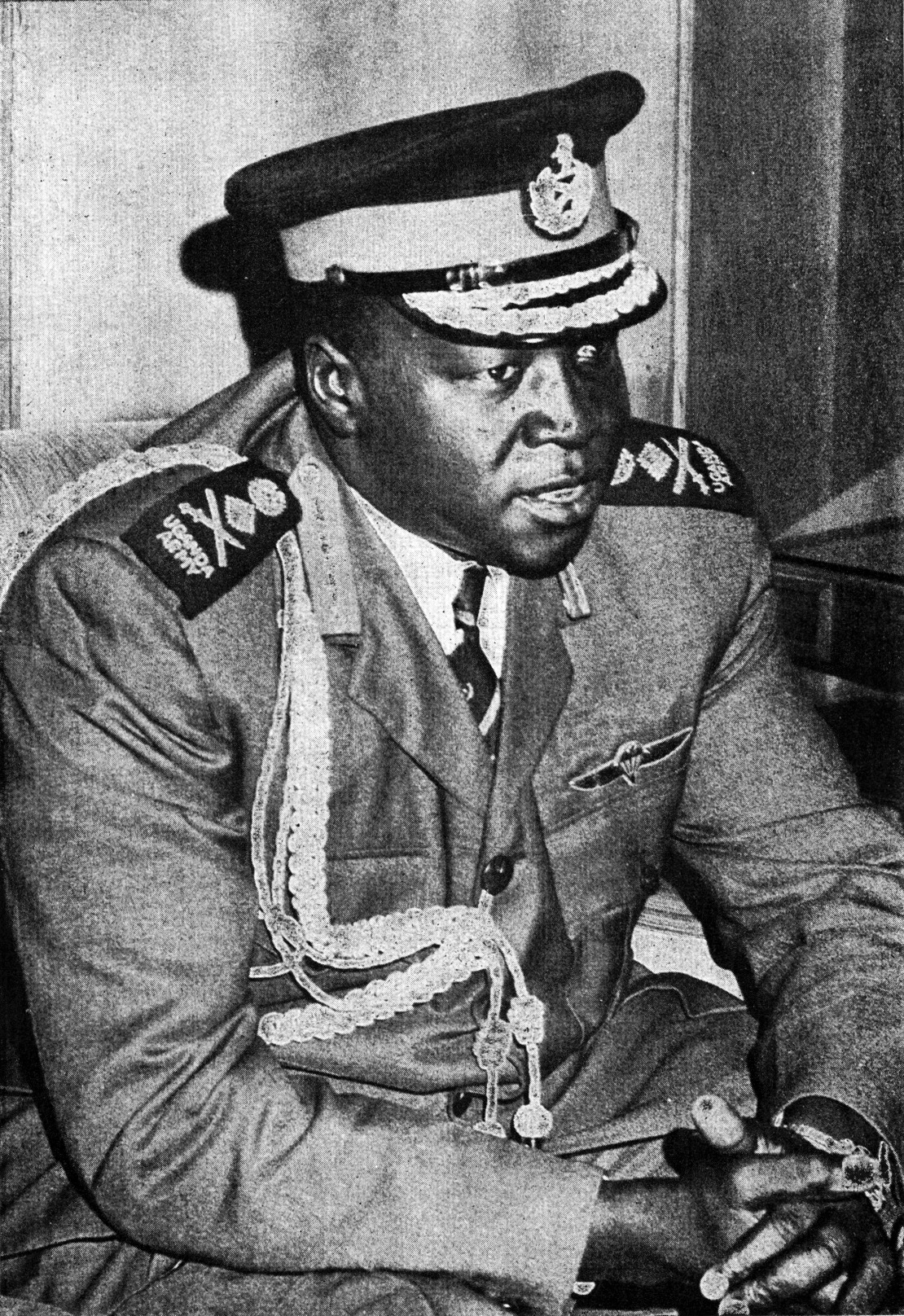
General Idi Amin was born in Kakwa ethnic group.

The Kakwa people rose to international prominence when General Idi Amin, of Kakwa ancestry, assumed power in Uganda through a military coup. He filled important military and civil positions in his administration with his ethnic group, and Nubians. He arrested and killed officials from other ethnic groups such as the Acholi and Lango people, whom he doubted. Idi Amin also supplied arms and financed the Sudanese Kakwa people in the first civil war of Sudan. The Kakwa officials in Idi Amin regime were later accused of many humanitarian crimes. After Amin was deposed in 1979, many Kakwa people were killed in revenge killings, causing others to leave the area and fled to Sudan. However, they have now returned to their native areas in the West Nile region of northern Uganda.

=== Ethnic violence ===
Dinka men with spears, necklaces and bracelets

For most of the South Sudanese Civil War, the fighting was focused in the Greater Upper Nile region. After the clashes in Juba in 2016, the fighting largely shifted to the previously safe haven of Equatoria, where the bulk of SPLM-IO forces went for shelter. Accounts point to both sides targeting civilians on ethnic lines between the Dinka and the dozens of ethnic groups among the Equatorian who are historically in conflict with the Dinka, such as the Karo, who include the Bari. Witnesses report Dinka soldiers threatening villagers that they will kill all Kakwa people for their alleged support to Machar and killing Pojulu people while sparing those who they find can speak Dinka. A UN investigation said rape was being used a tool of ethnic cleansing and Adama Dieng, the U.N.'s Special Adviser on the Prevention of Genocide, warned of genocide after visiting areas of fighting in Yei.

== Society and culture ==
The traditional Kakwa livelihood has been based on cultivating corn, millet, cassava, fishing and cattle. The traditional villages of Kakwa are linked by their lineage, with males forming councils of elders. Polygyny is accepted and practiced, while Christian and Islamic traditions form part of the Kakwa people's cultural value systems and living style.

=== Cuisine ===
The Kakwa people traditionally consume a variety of cultural foods, including maize, cassava, sorghum, millet, beans, cowpeas, sesame, groundnuts, and palm oil. Their diet also features yams, sweet potatoes, and an assortment of local fruits.

== Social organization ==
- Clans
- Lieages
- Councils of elders
- Traditional chiefs

Elders traditionally play an important role in conflict resolution and governance.Polygny is culturally accepted, though modern practices vary depending on religious and social influence.

== Ethnic conflict and civil wars ==
During the South Sudanese Civil War, Kakwa communities in Equatoria were affected by violence involving government and opposition forces. Reports indicated that the civilians from Equatorian ethnic groups, including the Kakwa, were targeted during ethnic violence, particularly afterclashes in Juba in 2016.

== Notable Kakwa people ==
- Idi Amin
- Moses Ali
- Abel Alier
- Archbishop Silvanus Wani [Former Archbishop]
- Martin Kenyi Terenzio
- Francis Ayume [Former Speaker]
- Charles Ayume [MP Koboko]
- Evelyn Anite [Former Minister/ MP]

== See also ==
- Ponjulu people
- West Nile sub-region
