= Mundari people =

Ethnic group of South Sudan

Mundari
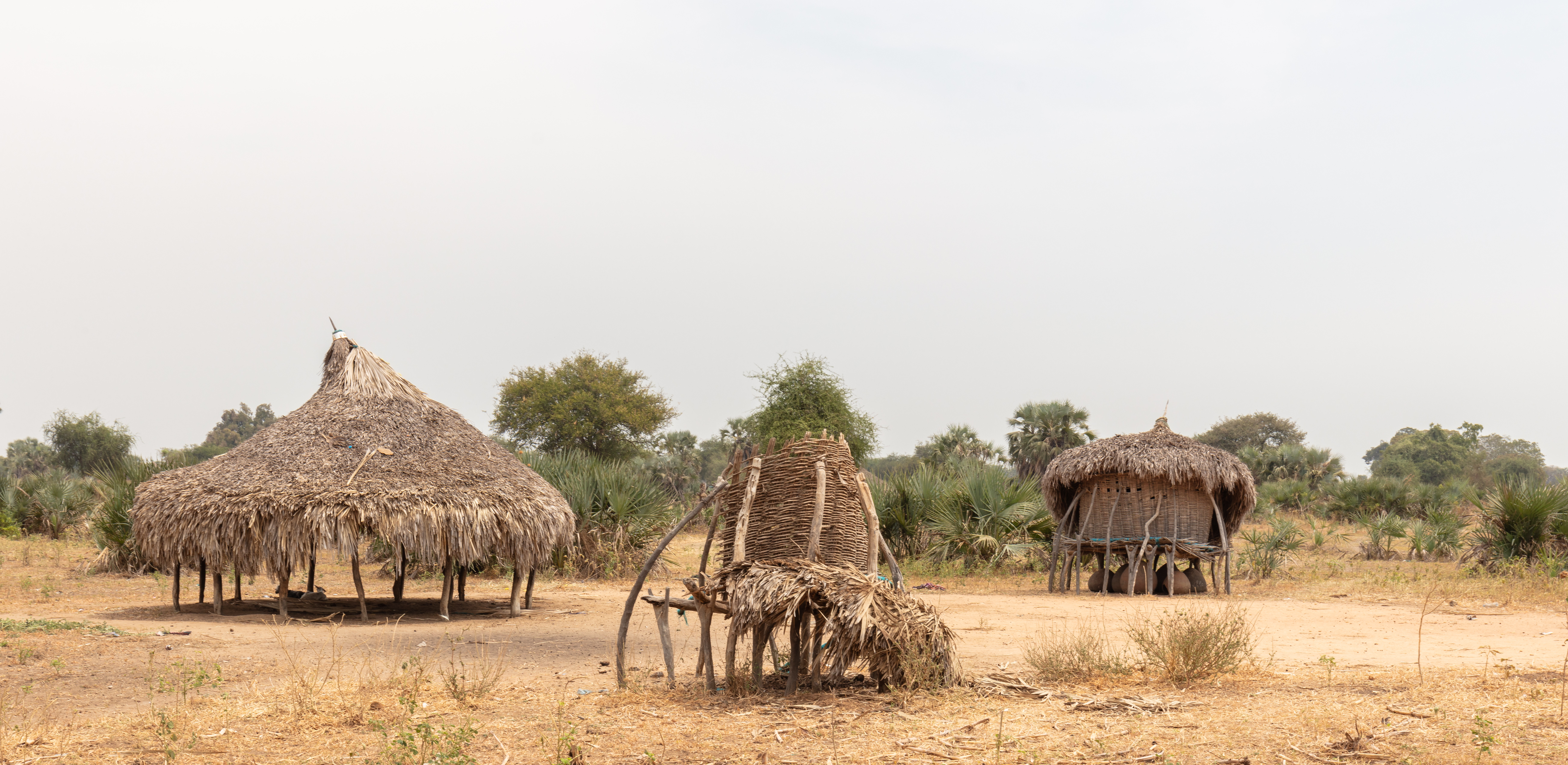
- Mundari village in Terekeka, South Sudan

Total population
- 70,000–100,000

Regions with significant populations
- South Sudan

Languages
- Mandari

Religion
- African traditional religion

Related ethnic groups
- Karo people, other Nilotic peoples

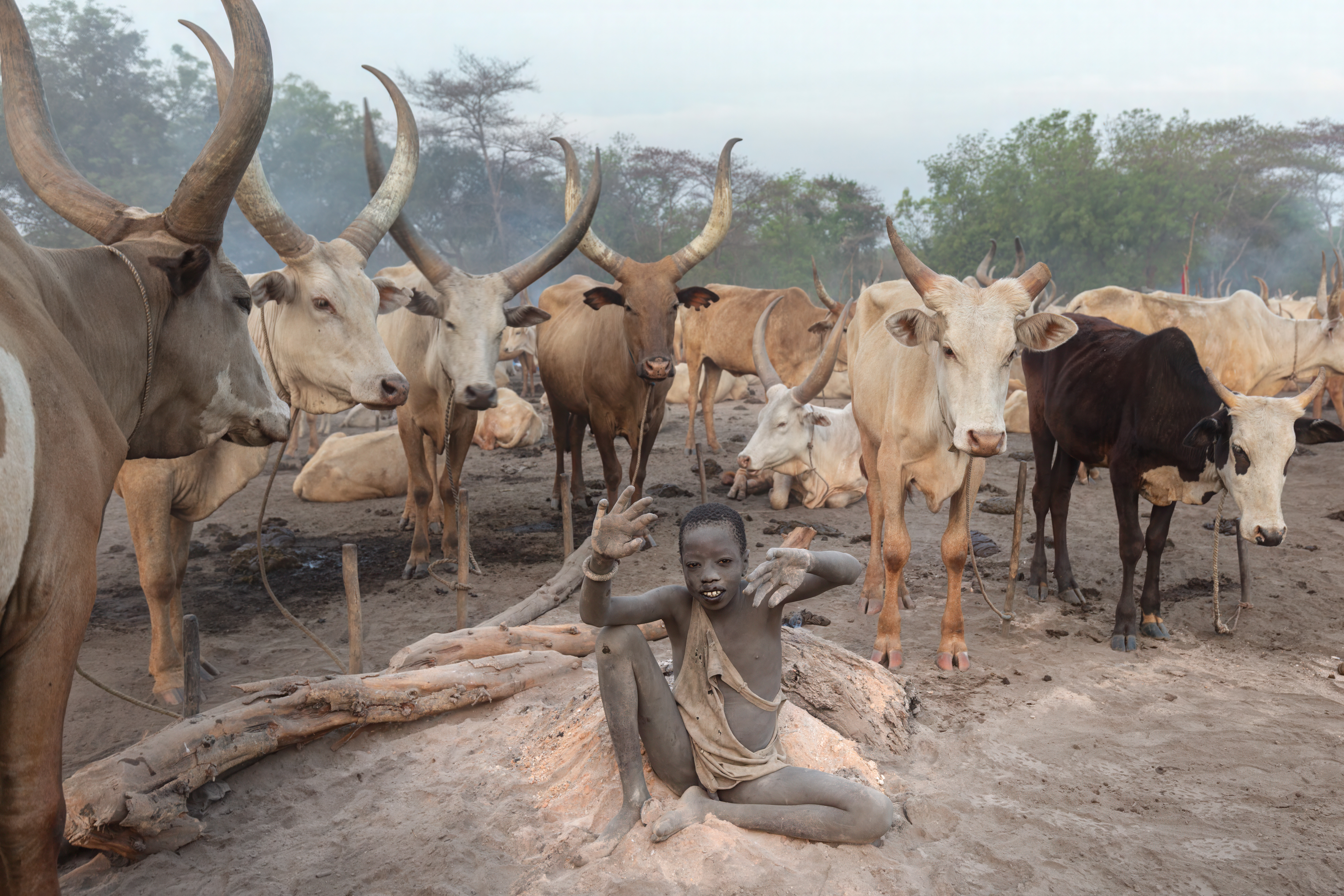
A boy near the cows

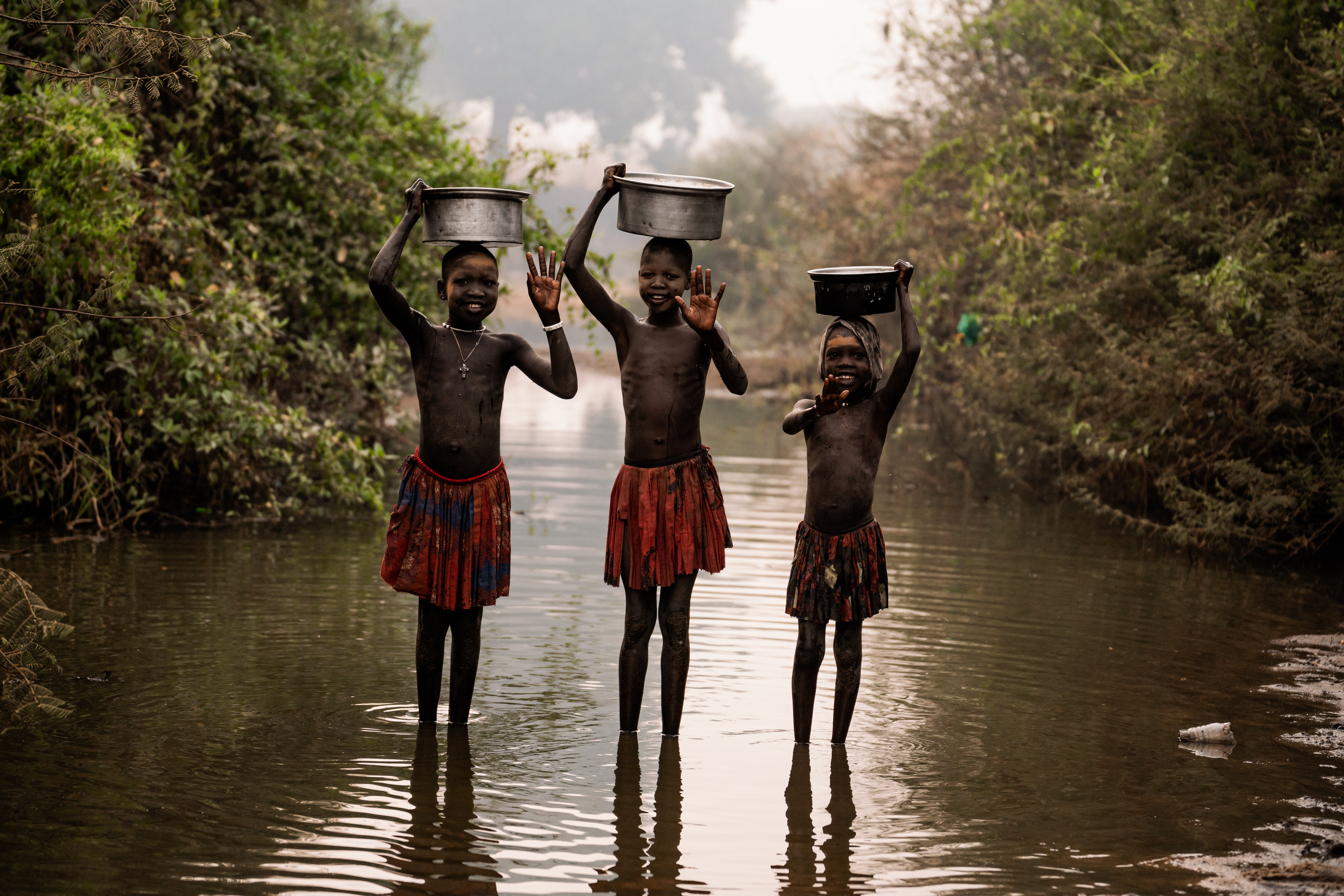
Mundari girls collecting water

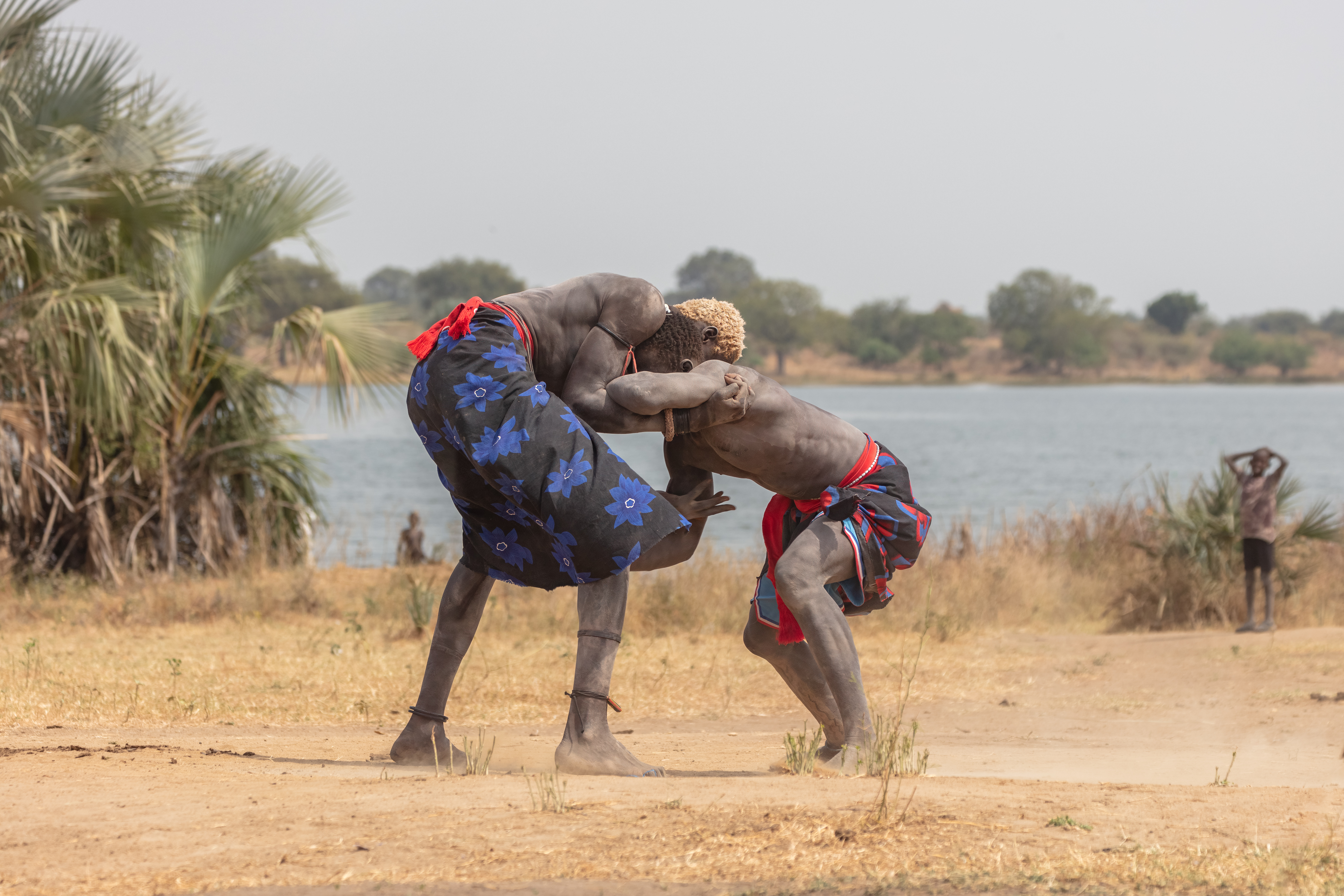
Mundari men wrestling, a prestigious game among the Mundari.

The Mundari are a small ethnic group of South Sudan. They are a part of the Karo people, one of the Karo ethnic groups.

The group is composed of cattle-herders and agriculturalists and are part of Karo people which also includes Bari, Pojulu, Kakwa, Kuku and Nyangwara. Kutuk na Mundari is also the name of their language, which is similar to Kutuk na Kuku, Kutuk na Kakwa, Kutuk na Pojulu, Kutuk na Bari, and Kutuk na Nyangwara.

== Tribal land ==
The traditional Mundari tribal lands are located roughly 75 kilometers north of Juba, the capital of South Sudan, and are centered on the town of Terekeka in the state of Central Equatoria. They are bordered to the north by the Bor Dinka at Pariak and to the south by the Bari of Juba (12 km) at Gwerkek, north of Peiti Northern Bari of the Juba base on 1956 British Colonial boundaries. Their lands are bounded on the east by the White Nile and extend west to Laka Ma'di in Western Equatoria state, an area roughly 100 by 75 kilometers in size.

The land, like much of South Sudan, is predominantly flat and marked by occasional isolated large hills. The low-lying land contains many rivers and lakes and is prone to flooding during the rainy season. The soil is predominantly clay-based, causing drainage and water retention problems, and provides a very fertile basis in support of cattle grazing. The main settlements in Mundariland are Terekeka, Gemeiza, Mangalla, Muni, Tombek, Tindilo, Tali, Rego, Rijong, Koweri, and Nyori.

== Culture ==
The Mundari, like other Nilotic tribes, are very cattle-oriented: cattle serve as a form of currency and a mark of status. Marriages are arranged by the prospective groom offering cattle to the bride's family, and husbands may take as many wives as they can support. The Mundari engage in perennial cattle raiding wars with the Bor Dinka during the dry season.

Mundari men sometimes bathe their hair in cow urine; the uric acid gives the hair a red, yellow, or orange color, which they regard as beautiful.

The Mundari also cultivate sorghum and catch fish using nets and spears.

In common with other Nilotic tribes in Sudan, the Mundari practice ritual scarification as a rite of passage into adulthood for young men. The typical Mundari scar pattern consists of two sets of three parallel lines, each on either side of the forehead, extending in a downward slope and unconnected in the middle.

== Gallery ==
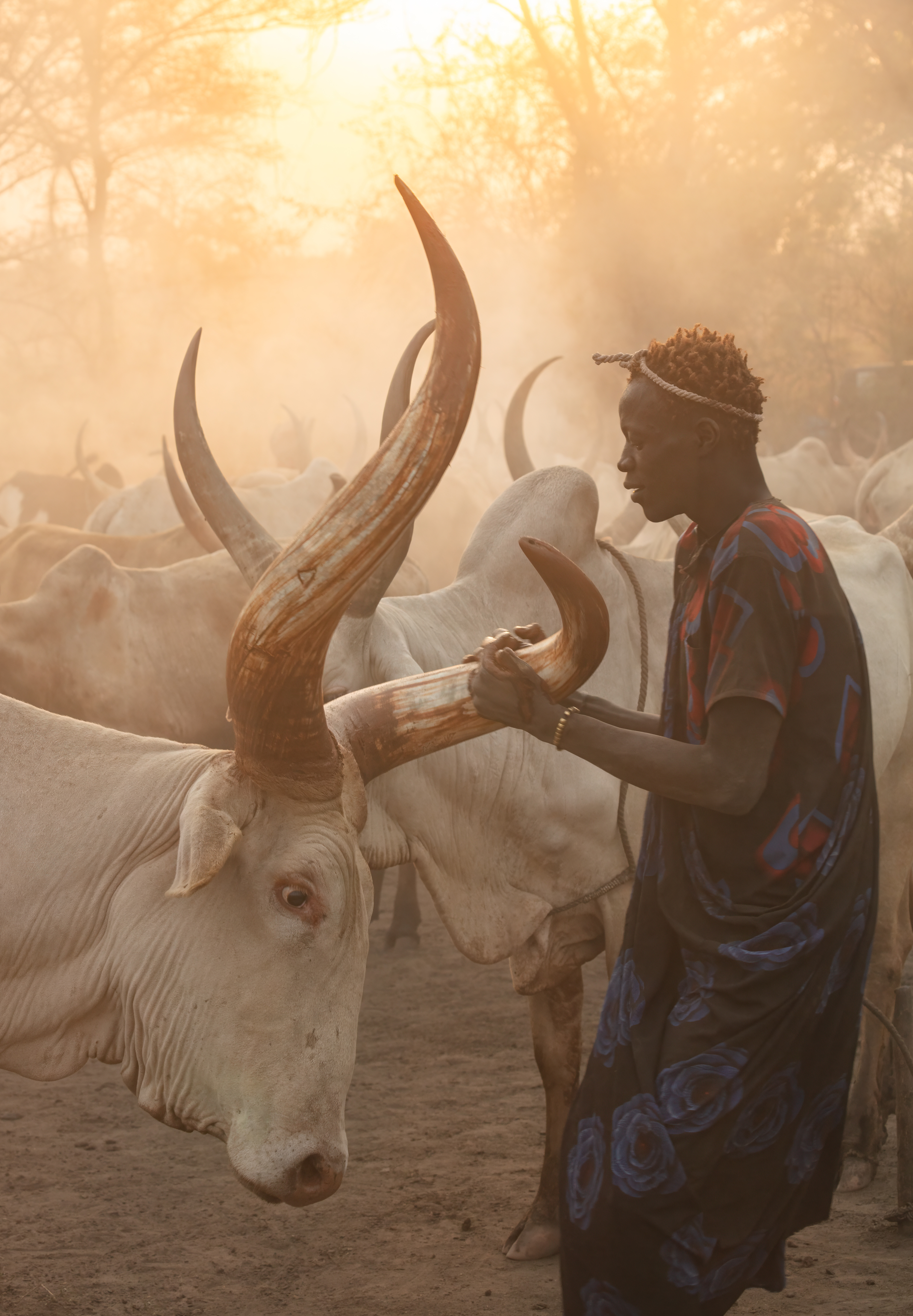
Cattle camp of the Mundari tribe, Terekeka, South Sudan

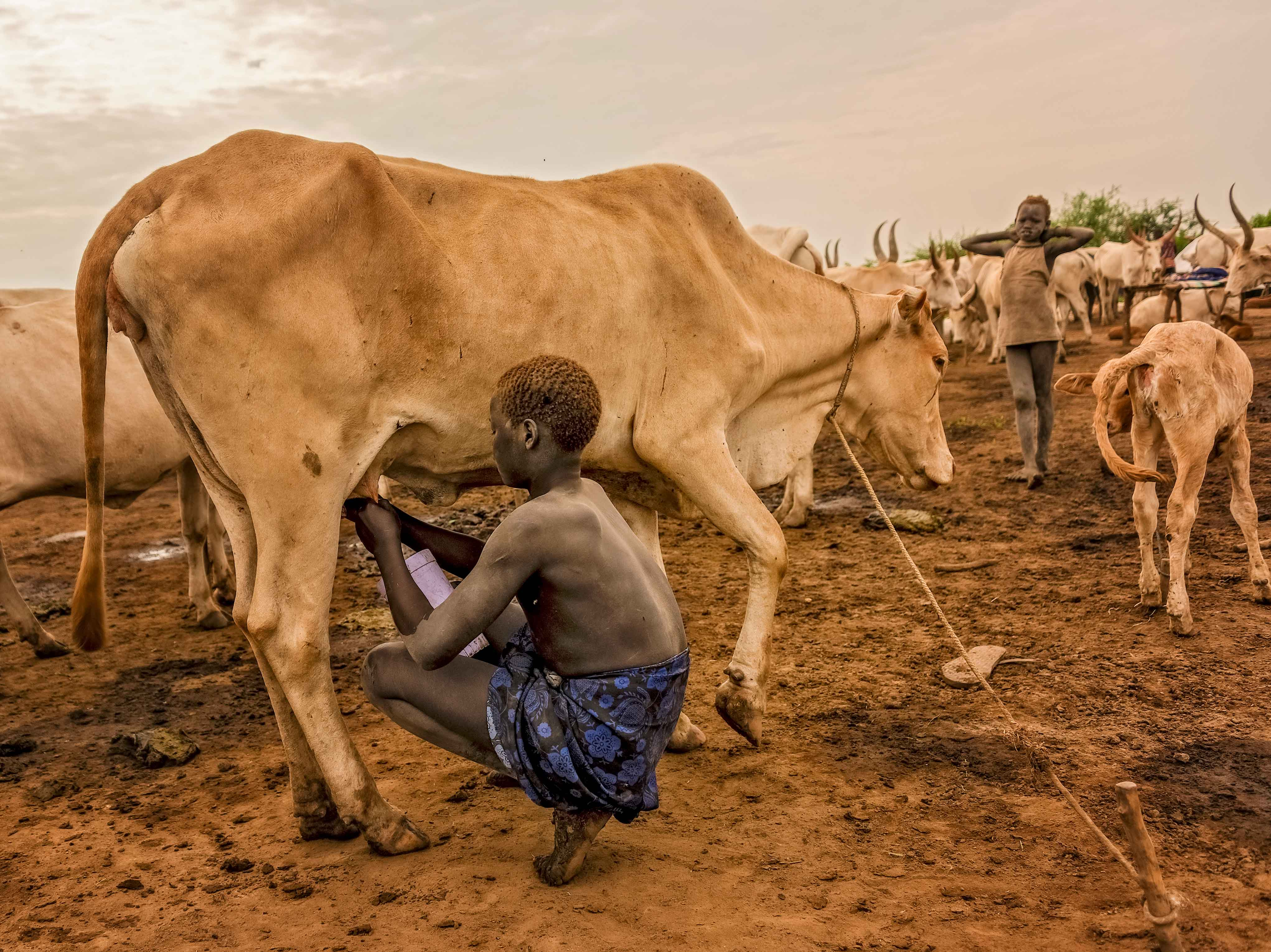
Boy milking cow in Mundari tribe, South Sudan.

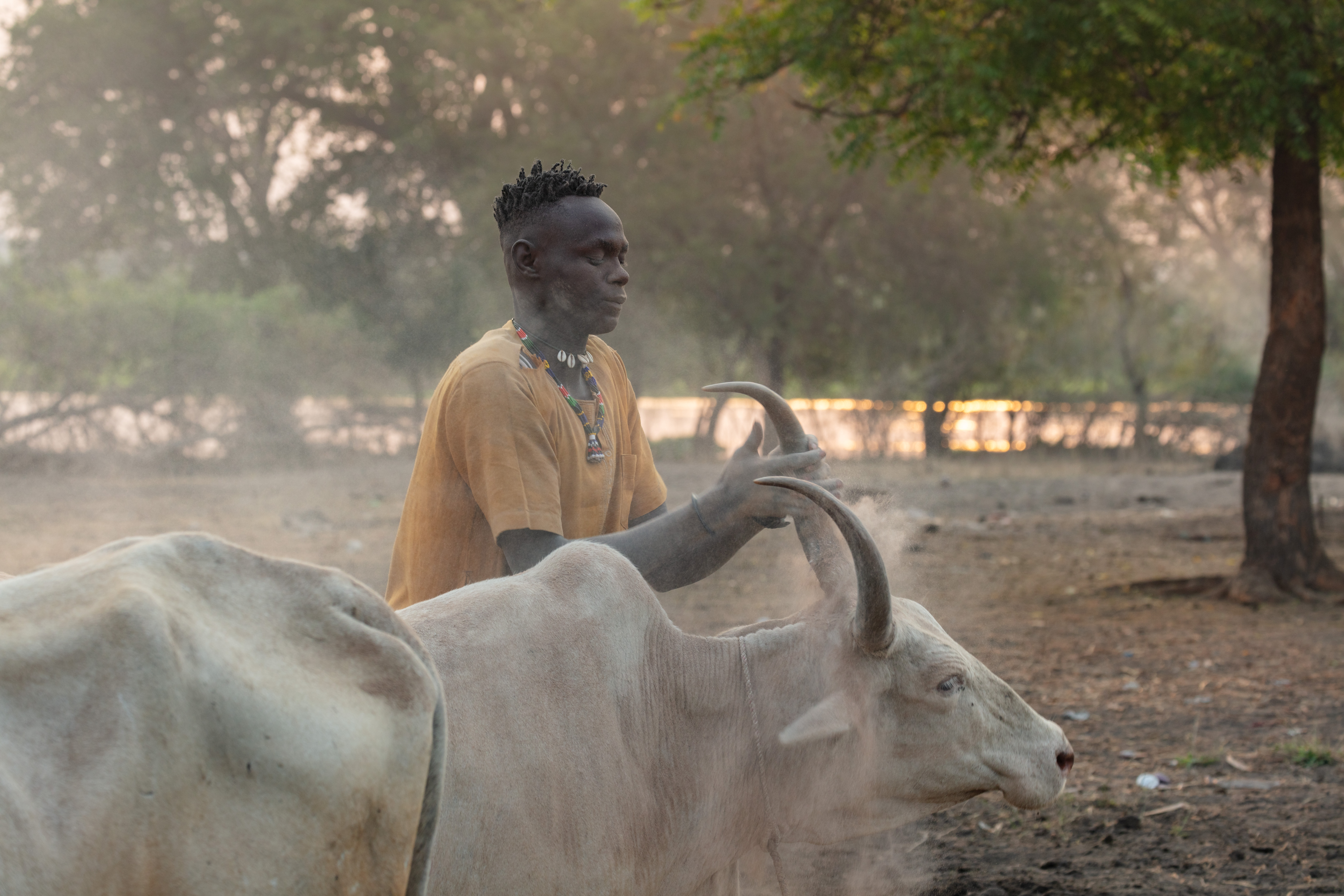
Mundari man putting ashes on a cow.

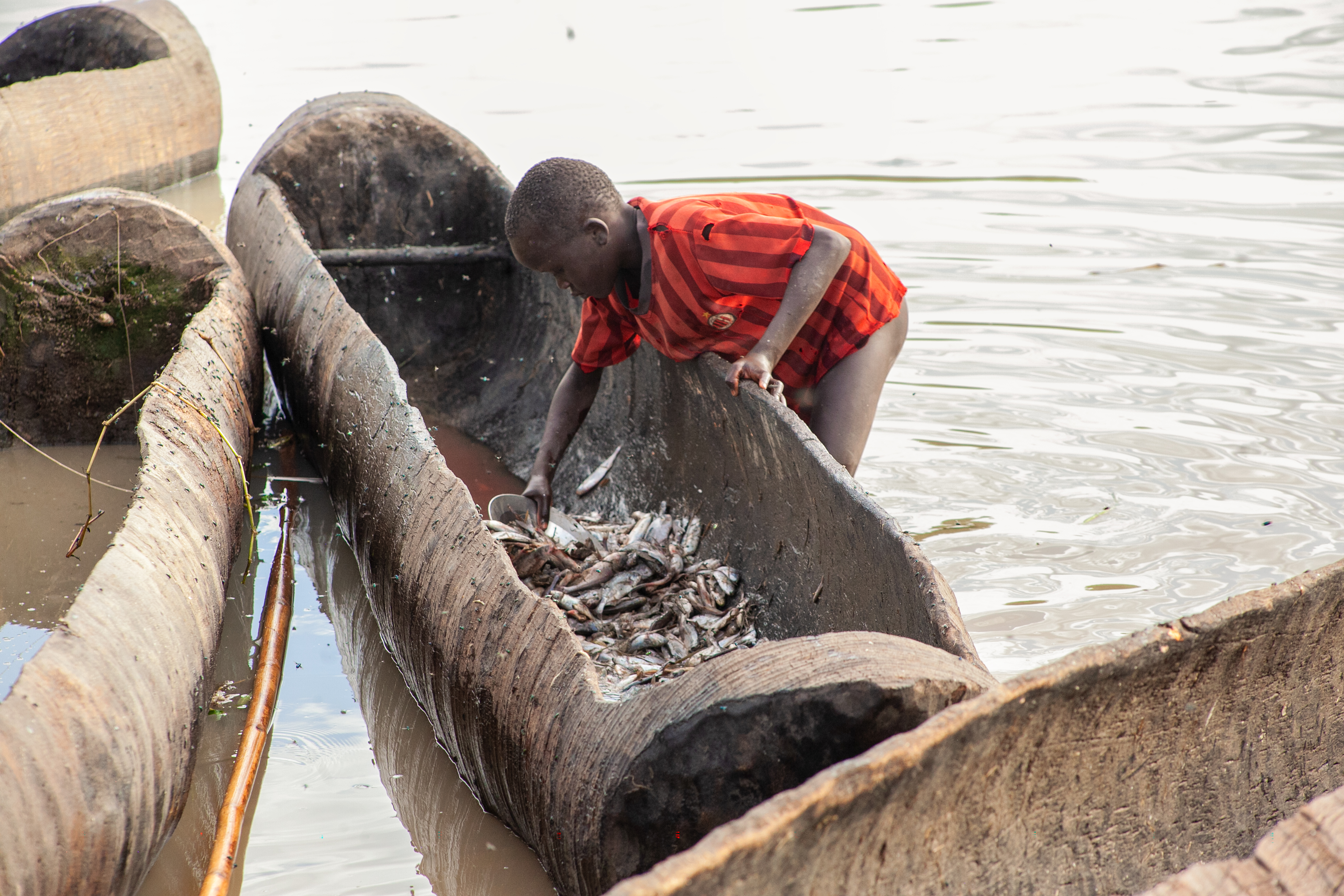
A young Mundari boy scoops fish from a fishing boat in South Sudan.

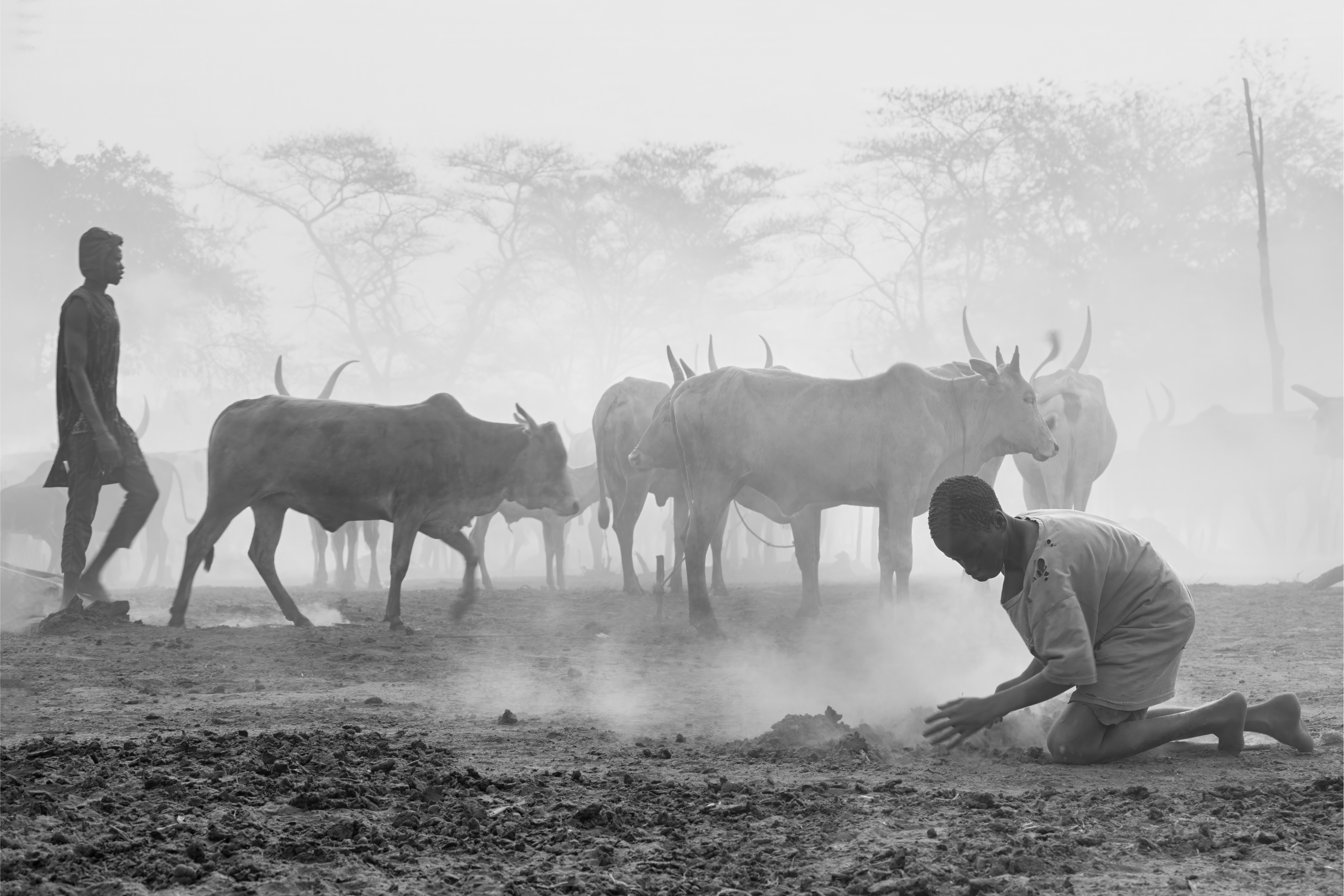
Mundari people collecting the cow dung to burn it.

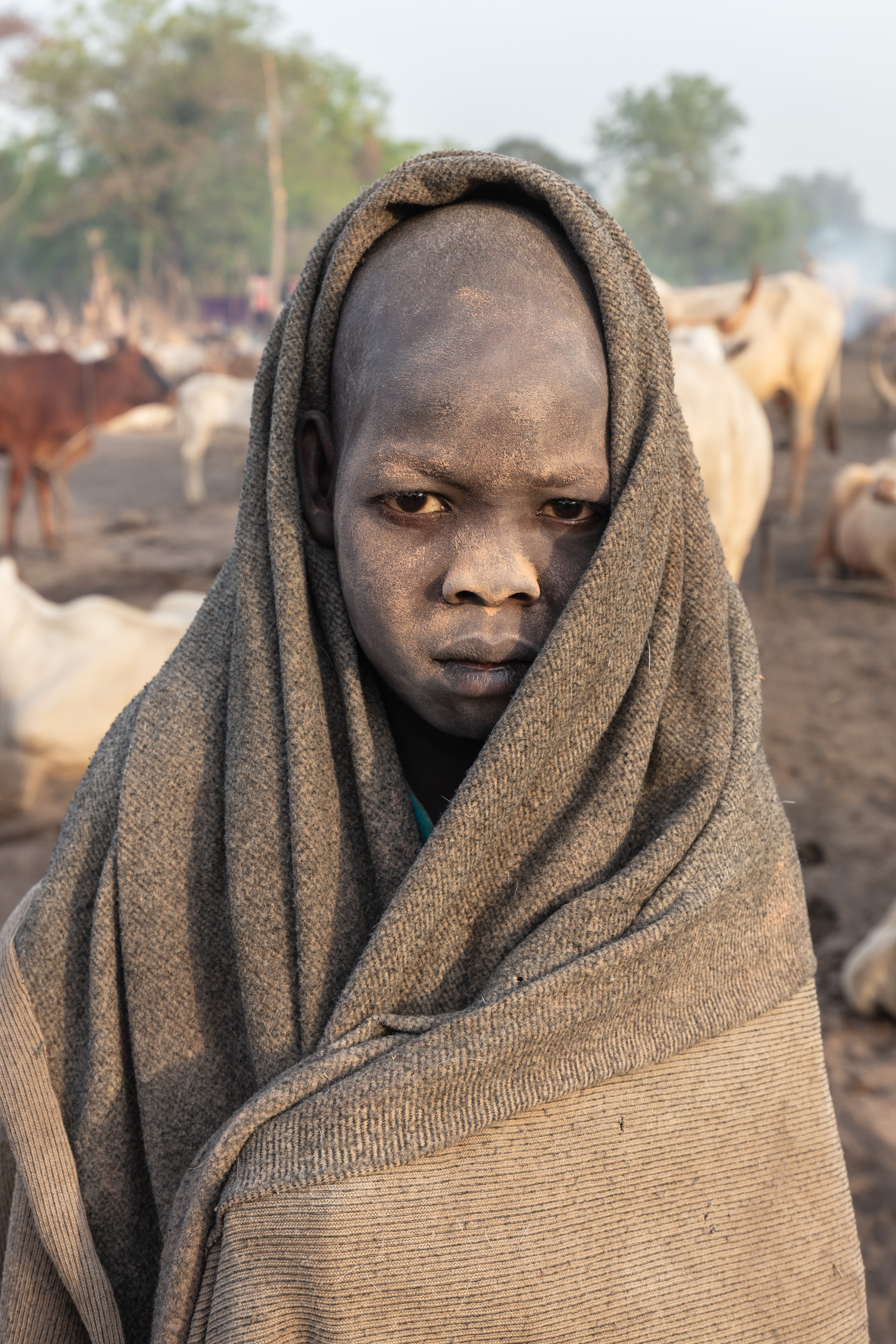
Mundari child in a cattle camp near Terekeka County, Central Equatoria state, South Sudan.
