= Pojulu people =

Tribe of the White Nile Valley

Pojulu
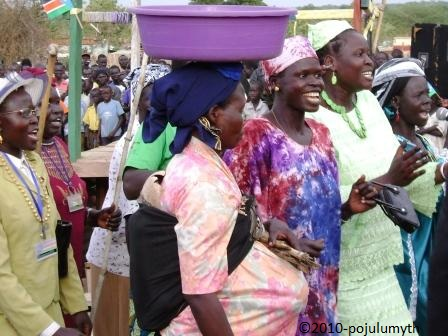
- A pregnant woman, carrying a child, a bucket of water and a bundle of wood demonstrates the suffering of women during the struggle in South Sudan

Regions with significant populations
- South Sudan

Languages
- Pojulu

Religion
- Christianity, Traditional

Related ethnic groups
- Other Nilotic peoples Especially other Karo peoples

The Pojulu (or Pojulu people) is a tribe of the savanna lands in the White Nile Valley, in the Equatoria region of South Sudan. They are Nilotic people and part of the Karo people—which also includes Bari, Mundari, Kakwa, Kuku, Nyangwara, and the Karo Tribes Of Omo Valley in Ethiopia such as the Banna, Hamer, Mursi, Kara, Dassanech, Arbore, Nyangatom known as the Omo Karo peoples.

The Pojulu differentiate into smaller clans of Nyori, Morsak, Korobura, Wonduruba, Mukaya, Goduk, Lobora, Moje, Mulusuk, Pirisa, Malari, Mankaro, Sadim, Jomi, Nyigo, Komojok, Limbe, Mundu, Jebelen, Maranga, Donni, Gokoni, Borri, Moyita, Gojang, Liggi, Soka, Yondoru, Mijibura, Wande, Wuji, nyainga, kweresak, Mundu, Dongoro, Lumuro, Soka, Jamara, Gbotoro, Yaribe, Morsak, Girim, Wolungu, Rongat, Mornyang, Bori, Goromu, Mugga, Giwaya, Pokula, Limbe, Gokiri, Muring, Wolungu, Lowinya, Mojumalat, Kupera, Dimu, pisak and many more.

== Geography ==
The majority of the Pojulu population are located in Lainya county of Central Equatoria state, including Mukaya Payam, Kenyi Payam, kupera Payam, lainya Payam, Wuji payam, mundu Payam. The Pojulu are also found in Juba and Yei county and in different parts of South sudan. Pojulu people also occupy the area from Lainya to Kagwada and Mukaya. The centre of Pojulu will be Kenyi Payam from Mundu 20 miles, Mukaya 18 miles, Wonduruba 21 miles, Bereka 15 miles, Lainya 9 miles and from Kagwada 22 miles.

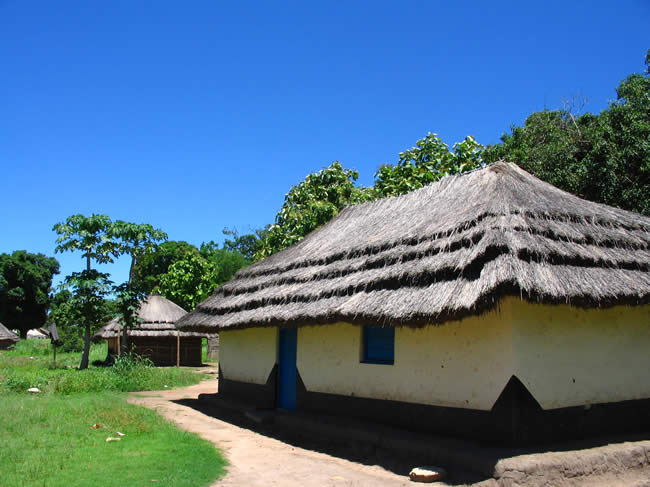
Thatched roofed house of the Pojulu, in South Sudan.

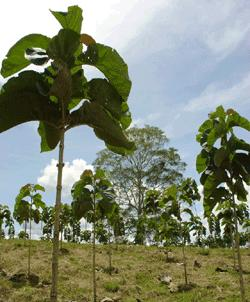
Loka Plantation Teak, in the largest teak plantation of Africa.

The name Pojulu is derived from several sources. The Pojulu language can be differentiated from all the other Bari speakers from the way they pronounce words, for example how other Bari speakers say their greetings or how each group socialize—such as along the roads from Juba up to Lainya and from Lainya to Bereka and Wonduruba.

== Resources ==
The pojulu land is a blessed place which has many various resources which are located in the various communities and clans as rivers also known with Pojulu language as (Kare/Kareya) which include (Liwadi in Wuji land, Kiju in Wuji Land, Su'bi in Giwaya land, 'Borong in Wuji land, Jurtule in Mali land, Museru river in Mogiri land, Giborong river in Wuji land, Dimot river in Muring land, Paja River in Mogiri land, Komi River found in between Yaribe land and Mundu land, Lire River in Lumuro, Koya river found in Limbe land, Loku Nyede River found in Kupera land, kumbajite River found in Bori land, Tengelepo River found in Bori land, Lopijojo River found in Bori land, Lire River found in Limuro land) among others and the land of the pojulu people is also blessed with mountains which are locally called with the Pojulu language as (Mere/Mereya) which include (Kemiru mountain found in Giwaya land, Mungoyo mountain found Mogiri land, Yoga mountain found in Mogiri land. Goryayan mountain found in Kweresak land, Kunirö mountain found in Kweresak land, Rogo mountain found in Wuji land Loduya mountain found in Kweresak land, Lozurya mountain found in Giwaya land, Bongile mountain found in Bori land, and Losira mountain found in Pirisa land, Gokiri mountain fouind in Gokiri land, Koro'be mountain) among others. other resources which are also available include the swamps, forests valleys among many more.

== Topography and weather ==
The environment in Central Equatoria is typically tropical. There can be arid periods with less rain. The neighboring tribes are Bari to the east, Nyangwara to the north, Kakwa to the south, Mundu to the west, and Avukaya to the northwest.

== Language ==
The Pojulu people speak the Kutuk na Pojulu language, as other Karo people, but with particular dialectic variation which highlights the difference between the Pojulu among the Karo. This Bari language has some distinct variations linked to people's daily activities and traditions that have evolved over time from their experiences.

== History ==
There is little knowledge about the origin of the Pojulu people, and their relation to the Bari and other Bari-speaking ethnic groups.

According to the 'Toposa Traditional History', the Bari-speaking people, of whom the Pojulu are an offshoot, are believed to have originated in the Kidepo Valley in the Kapoeta region. These Bari-speaking people were, however, forced out of Kapoeta and moved south and west by the Toposa, who are also believed to have migrated from Masindi port of Uganda. Being strong warriors, the Toposa raided and fought the Bari-speaking groups and took their girls, boys, women, and stock animals.

Therefore, the roots of the Pojulu community were traced through the use of linguistics and oral traditions to Bari ancestors in Kapoeta. The present Pojulu people are therefore pure descendants of in-common Bari ancestors through kinship. The present Toposa live in the Kidepo Valley, where the Pojulu originated. Statistically, the 21st-century Pojulu population is over 86,000 people (2004 estimate).

In the past, the Pojulu forged a rare alliance with Muru, Mundu against the marauding Azande armies. This cut off the main Azande force and led to the formation of the Makaraka.

=== Ancestral dispersion ===
The common ancestor of Bari groups was called Julu Lo Jululon. The dispersion of the Bari group from Kapoeta region might have been caused by several factors, which include:

- Tribal wars in Kapoeta
- Drought which made people move about looking for water, food and pasture for their cattle and large tracts of land for agriculture
- Population explosion

This common Julu Lo Jululon ancestor, together with all his people followed the Nile and settled along the Eastern Bank of the White Nile. From here a second dispersion took place possibly due to pressure for more land. It is from here where the Pojulu (are believed to have) declared their independence from the major Bari group, broke away, crossed the Nile westwards and continued their journey up to Gumbiri near the present geographical zone.

In the Gumbiri area, a third or final dispersion of the Pojulu people took place probably due to power struggle or lack of enough agricultural land. Then the Pojulu settled down in their present geographical locations. This was before the European Scramble for Africa.

The pre-history of the genesis of the Pojulu people originating from Kapoeta is illustrated by the similarities in the studies of linguistics and oral histories of the Toposa, Bari and the Pojulu peoples. These three groups have similar words in their languages:

Example	Goat	Salt	Sun
Pojulu/Bari	Kine	'Balang	Kolong
Toposa	Nyakine	Nyabalang	Nyakolong
Lotuko	Akine	Abalang	Akolong
Teso (Uganda)	Akine	Abalang	Akolong

=== Ethnic violence ===
For most of the South Sudanese Civil War, the fighting was focused in the Greater Upper Nile region. After the clashes in Juba in 2016, the fighting largely shifted to the previously safe haven of Equatoria, where the bulk of SPLM-IO forces went for shelter. Accounts point to both sides targeting civilians on ethnic lines between the Dinka and the dozens of ethnic groups among the Equatorian who are historically in conflict with the Dinka, such as the Karo, who include the Bari. Witnesses report Dinka soldiers threatening villagers that they will kill all Kakwa, another Karo people, for their alleged support to Machar and killing Pojulu people while sparing those who they find can speak Dinka. A UN investigation said rape was being used a tool of ethnic cleansing and Adama Dieng, the U.N.'s Special Adviser on the Prevention of Genocide, warned of genocide after visiting areas of fighting in Yei.

== Agriculture ==
The Pojulu economy is predominantly agrarian. The majority of Pojulu people are peasants practicing mixed farming: subsistence agriculture in which the main crops are cassava, sorghum, maize, simsim, groundnut, wheat, sweet potatoes, cabbages, beans, onions, tomatoes, okra, etc. The Pojulu keep goats, sheep, few pigs, chicken, ducks and cattle in some suitable areas due to the prevalence of tsetse fly which rendered cattle herding very difficult.

The Loka Plantation Teak forest is the largest teak plantation in Africa. The planted forest reserves within the Pojulu area are at Kawale, Lijo, Loka West, and Nuni.

There are different seasons for planting and land preparation by the pojulu, April and May is for land preparation July and August is for planting and November for harvesting.

== Agrarian economy ==
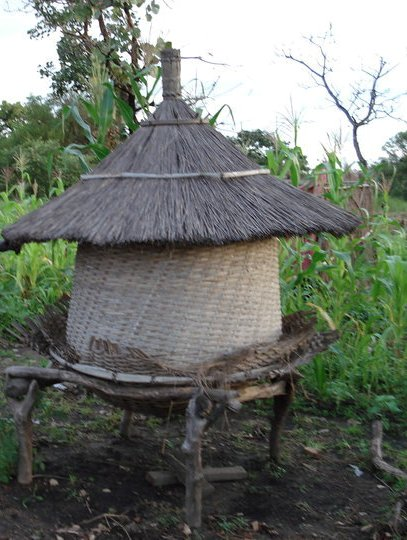
Known as GUGU, A storage for cereal crops such as maize, groundnut, sorghum, cow-peas, beans, and, the Wulu mostly used for keeping groundnuts and simsim for short period of time as to avoid damage by the rats, it's made up of spear grass round in shape and its tied up in a big tree which thieves cannot reach.

The Pojulu Economy depends largely on subsistence production. It is an economy which aims to meet the daily food needs of the Pojulu community. Activities range from reliance on animal husbandry to total dependence on crop production. The Pojulu use human labor combined with the most elementary tools locally made. This primitive mode of production has always dominated the livelihood of the Pojulu.

The Pojulu grow both staple and cash crops. The staple crops are for consumption and include cassava (banda) maize (baya), sorghum (jeri), simsim (konyung), beans (janjaru), cow peas (loputu), pigeon peas (burukusuk) and groundnuts (pulu). The cash crops include tobacco, cotton, coffee, and timber. The Pojulu people also harvest the wild fruits as food which some are locally called by the Pojulu language as Pete (Tamarin), Malat, Kendilu, Lomudi, Kasaram, Ngulube. They also obtained best cooking oil from local tree seeds which goes via various process after frying called Kumuroand konyung in the Pojulu language.

The Pojulu are not sophisticated in agricultural implements. They use local agricultural tools made locally by their own blacksmiths, using scrap iron. The local blacksmiths produce tools such as hoe (kole), sickle (megeles), axe (balata), arrow (gorr), spear (lowe), and knives (wale).

Animal wealth in Pojulu land includes goats (yidid), sheep (kabelok), chickens (sokorok), and cattle (kisok). They are raised for food, marriage, dowries, and as animal cash crop earning the Pojulu money to enable them to purchase other goods and services not locally made in their place.

=== Collective farming ===
The Pojulu practice "Mole"—a type of collective farming where a group of 5 to 10, or more people—are called to clear a field for a neighbor or relative in one or two days. Here, a goat is slaughtered, and beer is brewed for these people. This system of farming is advantageous. It clears hectares of land just in a day or so. "Lukonin" is also practiced, where two or more people agree to work in their farms on rotational basis. This system also saves time and effort. Women also do the same during preparation of land for planting and weeding of crops.

=== Subsistence agriculture ===
Past colonial regimes did nothing to improve the Pojulu reliance on subsistence agriculture. Successive Arab governments since Sudan independence perpetuated this primitive mode of production. The continuous civil wars exacerbated the problems until the 2011 formation of South Sudan. However, despite the practice of subsistence agriculture, the Pojulu never suffered a major famine. There was self-sufficiency in food production for local consumption in the Pojulu community. This food sufficiency is now sustaining the remnants from the civil wars in the Pojulu land.

=== Pojulu chiefs ===
The Pojulu chiefs play a great role in encouraging agricultural production. In the villages, chiefs pass local orders banning people from coming to the town or local station in the mornings. Bars for "Kwete" can be closed until noon, resulting in morning work at the farms. The chiefs are polygamous. Citizens volunteer to grow food crops for chiefs and their families. Meanwhile, during visits to the villages, the chiefs return food to needy families, a 'Pojulu food relief program.'

== Culture ==
Like other communities, the Pojulu have evolved an oral culture expressed in songs, poems, dance, music, folklore, magic.

Pojulu is the name by which this Bari-speaking ethnic community is known. Pojulu society ascribe to certain norms and values. As with other communities, pojulu is a male dominated society. The eldest male member of the family is entrusted with the responsibility of caring for the rest unless he demonstrates incompetence and irresponsibility.

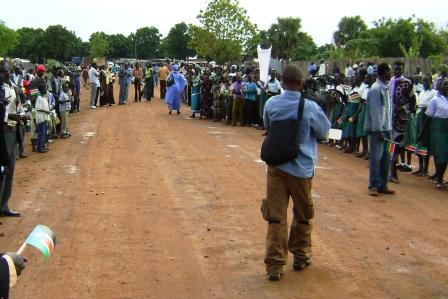
Pojulu from Lainya line up across the road to receive the SPLM delegation from Juba Southern Sudan 2009

In most Pojulu areas, the eldest male members are charged with the entire responsibilities of the family or clan and elder daughters are also considered responsible for the well-being of the older people. This is one of the reasons that led Pojulu women taking the role of being good careers. The Pojulu of today is different from the Pojulu of 50 years ago.

An example of a pojulu Name

=== Marriage ===
Marriage begins with courtship and once the prospective bride and groom have decided to marry each other, the matter is then reported to both families for endorsement. Pojulu dowry is in the form of goats, cattle and cash money. This is accompanied by celebrations and merriment. The Pojulu dowry is not settled at one go – even if there were prospects for that. The explanation is to maintain links and relationship between the two families, and during the marriage event there is a whole celebration for the whole relatives which includes dancing, drinking, singing and conversations.

The Pojulu specifically marry to produce children. Provision of services by the wife is secondary. If the new wife fails to conceive within a reasonable length of time, this creates worry and disappointment to the two families. Marriage in the Pojulu takes several methods and steps:

1.1 Mi'ya (Arranged marriage)

This is a marriage arranged by the parents of both the girl and the boy. This marriage in most cases is routed to pre-existing family friendship between the two families, especially among the parents. It can also be done in instances where the involved parties have challenges dating or finding a partner by themselves. When both families have agreed to the marriage, then the dowry is paid in installments until it is completed.

1.2 Finding a match

This is normally in social, cultural activities. For example, Cultural dances, festivals, funerals, marriage ceremonies, schools or even at homes. Following this, contacts are initiated and in most cases through associates (friends, relatives or parents), love messages are transmitted to both parties.

1.3 Exchange of visits and presents (Tu'yo)

In this stage, the two families or lovers begin to exchange visits to acquaint themselves or understand each other's background each other. Other visits may be followed by exchange of presents which range from pottery, basketry, handcraft, food items, beer, etc. In some instances, songs and praises are constructed to express the feelings by the two parties.

1.4 Declaration of marriage (Piya/Topiya)

When the man and his family are satisfied with the girl and her family, they will then send a message, declaring an intention to officially visit the girl's family to properly ask her hand in marriage. In recognition of the above steps, both families—aware of what is happening—begin to make necessary arrangements to have the two parties announce their intentions in the presence of the members family members, friends and well-wishers. This stage is considered the most binding for any meaningful marriage in the Pojulu culture. It is likened to taking an oath. Part of the bride wealth is normally settled, and once accepted the occasion is celebrated with drinks, food and dances lasting for days.

1.5 Handing over ceremony (Nyomoji)

Following declaration of marriage, the handing over ceremony is performed. This ceremony is prepared well in advance for the bride to be escorted to her new home. It is a commitment of both families, friends and wellwishers. On the side of the bride, the family ensures provision of support for domestic items such as cooking pots, bedding, and other domestic appliances necessary for starting a new home. Drinks are prepared for this function. On the side of the bridegroom, the family also prepares to receive their son's in-laws and the new bride. This occasion in itself is a big celebration characterized by dances and drinking. In performing this function, the balance of the bride wealth may be settled.

Another important feature in this function following the above, a few days later, is empowerment. The active player in this process is normally the mother-in-law through arrangements with the father-in-law of the bride to introduce her to her full responsibilities and to witness the first time the bride eats food prepared by her mother-in-law. This is a long Pojulu tradition that a bride or bridegroom does not eat food in the family where she/he is married to or marrying from until this function is performed. This is believed to be a measure of integrity and respect.

2. Forced marriage

In this kind of marriage, the boy takes the girl by force. It is a marriage that involves a lot of problems between the two families and may cause tribal or clan fights. However, after a heated debate and amicable discussion, marriage may be agreed upon and dowry is then paid.

3. Marriage through courtship

As it is briefly mentioned above, this is the normal and civilized method of marriage. Because choice of this marriage is an affair of both the boy and girl. When the relationship between the boy and the girl becomes strong, the girl then reveals it to her parents. The boy and girl are interviewed on whether they love each other and are willing to get married. Then, the parents give their approval or rejection. This is followed by screening of both families to check whether any one family has a social defect or bad social history. Neither the boy nor the girl will eat in either home, or parents with future in-laws. Marriage is by parental consent, and it is considered the most advisable and preferable of all marriages.

Children

The main aim of the Pojulu marriage is to produce children. It is for this reason that the mothers of the girls are advised to be strict on their girls' behaviors and movement. They are advised and coached well to be good housewives and good future mothers.

Domestic problems

In a Pojulu family, there can be 'problems' which make lives of a new married woman uncomfortable. The new wife is kept under suspicion throughout her life in the household:

1. If the wife takes a long time to conceive or bear a child, she is suspected of being a 'loose woman' and therefore barren.
2. During delivery, if labor takes a day or more, the mother is suspected of having committed adultery. She will then be requested to publicly declare the person involved in the adultery.
3. If a newly born baby does not breastfeed (rejecting the breast), the mother is also suspected, and the marriage is jeopardized and may lead to divorce.
4. If the husband is continuously unhealthy or his health deteriorates, or if he happens to have a wound that does not heal quickly, the wife is suspected, which may result in divorce.

Today, however, as a result of effects of civilization and the influence of religions such as Christianity, some of these 'problems' have been abandoned.

Birth confinement

Immediately after giving birth, the mother of the newly born child is confined in her hut or room for seven days but assisted by young children. She will have her meals in the room with the young children while taking care of her new baby. The whole period of her confinement may last 21 days. During this period, other women in the family or co-wives are charged with the responsibility of all the daily services in the house.

Naming ceremony

The occasion of giving a name to the newly born child is called "Yiji" in the Pojulu. Much food is prepared, e.g. meat, beans, variety of oils, beer, etc. Some people may slaughter a goat because of happiness in a new family member being added to their number.

After the traditions are performed, usually by women, a dance is staged when the women, their husbands and most of the youth in the location join in the dance and drink to the health of the newborn.

=== Death ===
Death, when it occurs—even in a natural circumstance of disease or old age—is usually attributed to some mishap and to it having been instigated. Family members have their heads shaved throughout the mourning period. Mourning may last up to a month.

In the Pojulu, death is treated with caution and respect for the deceased. A burial is normally done in the morning or evening—in the cooler hours of the day. Before any burial of the dead, maternal uncles have to be consulted and cleared of their requirements. The funerals can be peaceful if the traditional requirements are fulfilled otherwise, abrogation of the traditions/demands causes chaos. Christianity though has had quite an impact so much so that some traditional requirements considered evil in the Church are no longer being practiced. Today, many funerals are conducted in a Christian way.

=== Traditional authority ===
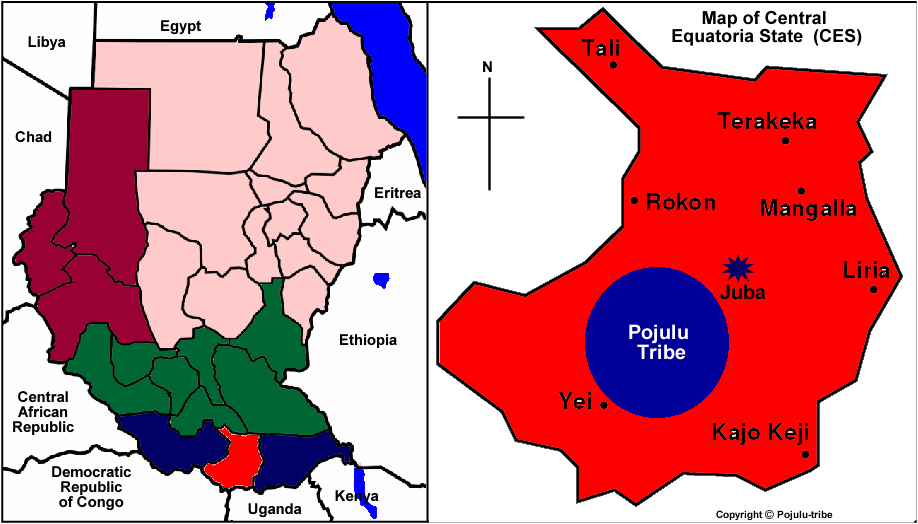
Geographical location of the Pojulu Tribe

The Pojulu chief has the role of a political leader with judicial powers. It is hereditary, usually falling to the eldest son of the departed chief. The Pojulu chief is always assisted by a council of elders, who come from different clans or families. The criterion of choosing these people is wisdom, bravery, and experience in matters pertaining to the tribe.

=== Spirituality ===
The Pojulu, like other Bari-speaking people, believe in a Supreme Being god (ŋun) who is the creator. They also believe in the existence of spirits of the departed ancestors. Many of these beliefs are now fading under the influence of modernity and Christianity. Choir in Pojulu

The Pojulu practiced African Traditional Religion before the introduction of Christianity. They practice some form of ancestral spirit worship. They strongly believe in one God. According to the Pojulu, it is He who creates, protects and destroys all mankind, irrespective of race, religion or political orientation. They believe that humankind is subject to the one Supreme power of God.

==== Biri religion (1910–1917) ====
There was among the Pojulu, a religion known as the Biri religion. This was a cultural import. The Biri religion came to the Pojulu, brought by the Muna Akufi between 1910–1917. In this religion, people were baptized; however, unlike Christianity, in the Biri religion, water is not used in baptism. When Christianity was introduced, it was accepted without resistance. The first man was baptised by water in 1920, in Lainya County.

Traces of the Biri religion are still known among the Pojulu today in the names of the converts. Because believers of the Biri religion received names such as Makambili, Kamara, Doromo, Piri-Piri, Kamisa, Maamet, Malangi, etc. The converts became disciples. They were considered holy, and they spread the Biri religion to other lands. They traveled from village to village – converting unbelievers into the Biri religion. This was their fellowship. When the Biri religion died out, it gave way to Christianity which was better able to meet the spiritual and material needs of the believers.

==== Islam ====
Since the Ottoman Empire, and through the Mahdiya, Islam has little impact on the Pojulu. And during the era of General Ibrahim Abboud (1958–1964), attempts were made to introduce Islam to the Pojulu. These attempts were unsuccessful. Khalwa and Maahads flourished in the major towns, and it was in these towns that some Pojulu converted to Islam and adopted Islamic names.

==== Christianity ====
Christianity is foreign to the Pojulu; it came to Yei in 1916 and spread throughout Pojulu lands. In 1929, Nugent School was opened in Loka, and from there Christianity became more widespread. The African Traditional Religions (ART) prepared some of the Pojulu to practice Christianity. Christian Pojulus have gathered to create and develop Christian institutions, such as St. Peters Yondoru, and to train Christian leaders.

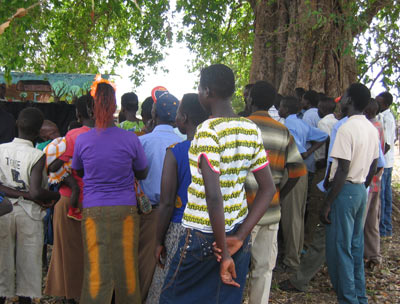
Pojulu people gather together on art, music etc.

=== Education ===
Education to the Pojulu is lifelong. It takes place anywhere in the community, at work and at play and from cradle to the grave. Such education is defined as the "aggregate of all the process by means of which a person develops abilities, attitudes, and other forms of behavior of positive value in the society in which they live". Education includes all the learning experiences that shape one into a person.

Traditional goals

The goals of Pojulu traditional education include:

1. To teach children customs, mores, and traditions in order to preserve the culture and ideals of the Pojulu society.
2. To give young people skills and knowledge for making a living as adults. For instance, the skills of gardening, farming, hunting, gathering, fishing, marriage, singing and dancing.
3. To preserve the Pojulu traditions, leading a life loyal to the elders, clan, and tribe and to be faithful and respectful to the gods.
4. To improve ethical character, training for obedience and self-discipline. The goal is a disciplined individual, in a disciplined family, living in social harmony in a disciplined society.

Early education

The Pojulu initiated and developed their own indigenous system of education suited to their environment and for their needs. The Pojulu therefore have practiced education since their cultural formation.

In Pojulu society, the home is regarded as a child's first place of learning, with the family fireplace serving as a setting for informal education. Children are taught values associated with service and responsibility through both instruction and practical experience. These teachings are intended to influence their personal development and conduct.

The subject matter taught at home is various and wide. Very early the lesson of helpfulness is taught the child. As soon as strength and reasoning powers are sufficiently developed, they are given duties to perform at home. They are encouraged to help the father and the mother and convenience them first before their own needs, to watch for opportunities, to cheer and assist brothers, sisters, playmates and to show kindness to the aged, the sick, the old and the unfortunate. They are taught to find joy in service and sacrifice for the goods of others and the community at large.

Teachers

The family circle, the Neighbours and the tribal groupings exercised great influence and impact on the growth, development and education of the Pojulu child. This is the principle of communitarians, that the Pojulu child is not left to the parents to bring it up. The community also participates in the development and education of the child. The child is a collective responsibility of the parents, clan and the tribe.

Pojulu indigenous type of education starts at the time the child is born and ends with death. The Pojulu system of education is a participatory, practical system of education. It imparts what the child must know through the family and clan traditions. It is generally an informal education. In this system, there are no buildings, classrooms or schools, only the fireplace, big shady trees, etc., which provide the classrooms. Teachers are available in the person of the father, the mother, grandmother, baby-sitter, brothers and sisters, relatives and the entire community or neighborhood.

=== Indigenous education ===
Most skills about knowledge about things and the environment are absorbed by children through observation and initiation of the elders and older peers. Some children learn by apprenticeship. The importance of both parents on the growing and developing child is of great value as they are closest to the child.

Parents and the community teach the children the laws and customs of the clan and tribe, which govern moral code, civic codes, and general rules of etiquette in the community. This category includes the study of civics, sociology and the tribal laws. The late president of Kenya, Mzee Jomo Kenyatta, wrote "when the child has grown beyond childhood, the father takes charge of part of the boy's education, and the mother takes the whole responsibility of the girl's education and a part of the boy's education."

The girls do domestic duties to help their mothers, such as cooking and family care. They also learn preparation of land for planting and weeding of crops. The boys' duties include rearing domestic animals and gathering firewood for cooking and heat. Boys learn about vegetation identifying their types, uses and names—including various trees in the nearby forest. They learn which trees are useful for building houses and grain stores, such as those which resist white ants. They must identify which trees are good for making bows and arrows for weapons in hunting animals. The boys also learn about the birds: which are edible or harmful to crops; and how to trap or hunt them.

The boys and girls learn the plants that provide the Pojulu with herbal medicines, such as "Dikori Ti – Melo", in the community medicine tradition.

=== Missionary schools ===
The first missionaries to enter Yei were Reverends Shaw and Gwynne in 1911. However missionary activity did not begin in Yei until 1917 when schools were founded; there had been a prevalence of sleeping sickness in the area, affecting both the Pojulu and missionaries. In 1929, missionary work extended to Loka where Nugent School was opened for boys. This was the only Christian intermediate missionary school in Pojulu land. Lainya Technical School was also opened around the same time, for training in the trades, such as for carpenters, masons and brick makers, and plumbers.

The Roman Catholic Diocese of Yei built the Yei Girls' School in 1940. This school recruited pupils as far as Pojulu land in Loka and Lainya. Miss Gilbert became the headmistress of the Yei Girls' School, until retirement in the late 1960s. Pupils were taught in Bangalla, and later in Bari and English.

== Present day ==
The long running Second Sudanese Civil War caused drastic changes in the lives of the Pojulu. Many were displaced and this eroded their social and family fabric. At its formal conclusion in 2005 a separate administrative unit was established separating the Pojulu from the Kakwa and others in Yei River District. In 2011 the Pojulu lands became part of the new nation of South Sudan.

=== Diaspora ===
The diaspora of the Pojulu people is highlighted by the move to Uganda, Kenya, Ethiopia, Democratic Republic of Congo (DRC), South Africa and Egypt. Others live in displaced people's camps in Juba, Khartoum and other countries outside of Africa. Some are now living in the US, UK, Israel, Europe, New Zealand, Australia and Canada.

== Notable people ==
- Dr Samson L. Kwaje
- Brig. Gen. Abraham Wani Yoane Bondo
- Eliaba James Surur
- Augustino Kiri Gwolo
- Jimmy Lemi
- Taban Lupayi
- Dr. Martin Elia Lomuro
- Aggrey Jaden Ladu
- Gen. Ali Luwaya

== See also ==
- Bari Language
- Bari people
- Kuku people
- Mundari Tribe
- Pojulu Cultural Festival
