= Kakwa language =

Language of Africa

Kakwa
- Kakuwâ
- Native to: Uganda, Democratic Republic of the Congo, South Sudan
- Ethnicity: Kakuwâ
- Native speakers: 510,000 (2014–2023)
- Language family: Nilo-Saharan?: Eastern Sudanic; Southern Eastern; Nilotic; Eastern; Bari; Kakwa

Language codes
- ISO 639-3: keo
- Glottolog: kakw1240

The Kakwa language (also rendered Kakuwâ) is a Nilotic language spoken by the Kakwa people in Uganda, the Democratic Republic of the Congo, and South Sudan.
