= Nyangwara people =

The Nyangwara, also known as the Yangwara, are a Nilotic ethnic group living in the state of Central Equatoria, South Sudan. The population numbers between 25,000 and 50,000 people, and is divided between the Terekeka and Juba Districts. Their largest town is Rokon, which lies about 53 miles west of Juba.

== History and mythology ==
Tradition has it that the Yangwara like all the other Nilo-Hamite groups migrated to their present location from the area near Lake Turkana. The name Nyangwara is the distortion of the word Yangwara which simply means horns. They must have been ferocious fighters, seeing as they managed to push the Pöjulu and the Moro to the south and west respectively.

== Economy ==
The Yangwara economy is primarily agricultural based. Members of the group keep cattle, sheep and goats, and farm crops such as sorghum, millet, groundnuts, simsim, beans and cassava. These crops were sometimes produced in commercial quantity which has made the Yangwara the principal suppliers of food to Juba.

Yangwara land enjoys a tropical to rich savannah type of climate. It is endowed with deep fertile soil and is dissected by a number of perennial streams that drain into the river Nile. It receives rains between March and November enough to sustain extensive agricultural activities in the area.

== Culture ==
The Yangwara society is predominantly agrarian. The society is organised into agnatic lineages of which the clans are the smallest unit. Most of Yangwara social events take place within the families and clans. The Nyangwara have no special initiation ceremonies whatsoever. However, certain norms are universally observed among the Yangwara under the guidance of the chiefs and elders.

=== Language ===
The Yangwara speak a dialect of the Bari language.

=== Marriage ===
Marriage among the Yangwara used to be arranged between parents. A girl was betrothed at an early age but this has now died out due to rebellion by women. Due to this, the elders have now ruled against this practice, giving the girls the choice to select their prospective husbands. The parents play an advisory role in the affairs of their daughters only in cases of whether or not the suitor has sufficient assets for the dowry. A number of goats and money is paid as dowry.

=== Naming ===
Naming of the new born differs from one clan to the other but is performed after 3 days for a girl and 4 days for a boy. In most cases children carry the ancestor’s name. Yangwara have names that signify such occasions as death, hunting, disaster, war, drought, famine. A stranger passing next to the house during a child birth labour may be requested to name the child.

=== Death ===
Death among the Yangwara is respected and the deceased is mourned for 3 or 4 days during which several rituals are performed. The close relatives of the deceased slaughter a billy-goat for the funeral rite (karama). A widower may marry after a prescribed period of mourning. However, a widow is given an opportunity to choose a relative of deceased to take care of her and the children.

=== Spirituality and beliefs ===
Like the other Bari-speaking peoples, the Yangwara are highly superstitious and they explain all kinds of misfortunes and disasters to spirits of the departed relatives. They offer sacrifices in the form of goats or cocks to the spirits for healing the sick. They also perform witchcraft through a medium (kujur).

=== Arts, music, literature and craft ===
The Yangwara share much in terms of social values and customs with the Pöjulu, Bari and Mundari. These are expressed and transmitted orally in songs, music, dance, poetry, folklore and stories. The Yangwara literature like that of the other non-literate communities is oral. Among the Yangwara, the men have perfected the arts of making bee-hives, bow, arrows, spears, granaries of different size and shapes; snares and nets for trapping game. The women on the other hand have engaged in the art of pottery, windowing pan, baskets and food trays.

== Socio-political organisation ==
Yangwara society is structured along clan lineages. There is a clan leader whose role is to see that there is harmony and peace in the clan. The clan leader settles petty disputes but if that becomes complicated the case is referred to the sub-chief who administers a number of clans. The Sultan is the highest authority of the village. He is assisted by the sub-chiefs and the elders. The rainmakers, like spiritual leaders, wield authority respect among the Nyangwara. The Yangwara chieftainship combines spirituality and royalty. Should a Sultan die, a senior sub-chief takes over immediately for a period of 2 to 3 months during which the royal family puts up a name of one of his children of the late chief for endorsement by the council of elders.

The socio-political organisation of the Yangwara was an important factor in their recruitment by the colonial authorities as administrative chiefs, police, prison warders, not only over the Yangwara but also over other neighbouring recalcitrant ethnic communities.

== Neighbours and foreign relations ==
The Yangwara neighbour the Bari to the east and southeast; Mundari and Moro Kodo to north and northeast; the More to the northwest; the Pöjulu and the Kakwa to the south and southwest. The Yangwara expect reciprocal respect for their social norms from foreigners. They intermarry freely with other nationalities. Indeed, many groups have settled without difficulty in the Yangwara land.

=== Recent developments ===
The Yangwara like many other communities in central Equatoria were affected by the war. Many were displaced and their social and economic activities disrupted. Yangwara County based in Kitegere has been carved out of Juba County. This gives the Yangwara a separate administration and an opportunity to participate in decisions that affect their lives. Many Yangwara people converted to Christianity and there is now an Episcopal Church of South Sudan Diocese of Rokon, St. Peter and catholic Parish.

=== Diaspora ===
There are many Yangwara who have settled in the Moro land, many have migrated to Juba and others have made it to America, Canada and Australia.
