= Lakes State conflicts (2019–2021) =

- Part of Ethnic violence in South Sudan
- Counties of Lakes State
Date	April 2019 - late 2021
Location	Lakes State, (Note: Until February 2020, Western Lakes State, Eastern Lakes State, and Gok State.) South Sudan
Result	Inconclusive: Appointment of Rin Tueny Mabor as governor and dissipation of violence

Belligerents
Agar Dinka: Athoi militiamen; Gony militiamen; Rup Dinka; Pakam Dinka	Gok Dinka: Macar militiamen; SSPDF soldiers (Note: Some SSPDF soldiers fought in intra-Gok disputes.); Agar Dinka: Athoi militiamen; Thiyuc militiamen	SSPDF UNMISS

Commanders and leaders
Unknown	Unknown	Rin Tueny Mabor; Makur Kulang Liei Shailesh Tinaikar

Casualties and losses
Unknown	Unknown	8+ killed, 9+ injured 2 killed
- 250+ killed 300+ injured (Note: Total, April 2019 to February 2020. The exact number of deaths and displaced across all conflicts is unknown. Adding up all mentioned deaths after February 2020, combined with the ICRC's 250-300 casualty claim, would provide a total minimum of 433 killed and 445 injured.)

After the end of the South Sudanese Civil War in 2018, localized cattle-raiding conflicts and reprisal attacks increased in Lakes State, mostly between Dinka clans in Lakes State and the major counties of Rumbek and Cueibet. The conflicts largely subsided after the appointment of Rin Tueny as governor of the state in June 2021.

== Background ==
Dinka is the dominant ethnic group in central South Sudan's Lakes State. Outside of Yirol and Rumbek, there are very few natural resources in the state and communities in Lakes State have historically been cattle herders and cattle rustlers, even throughout the Second Sudanese Civil War and the South Sudanese Civil War. The lack of defined borders for clans and sub-clans, much less defined county borders, has made the intrusion of one group's territory by another pastoralist group looking for a watering hole for their cattle a common occurrence. In recent decades cattle rustling has increased with it becoming embedded in the local youth culture. Local youth in Lakes States have turned to cattle rustling because of a worsening economy and rising bride prices which are usually paid with cattle. Cattle rustling combined with the proliferation of weapons in Lakes State communities has led to high levels of insecurity and displacement, which has subsequently spurred an increase in violent conflicts.

In the Rumbek area, which includes Rumbek East County and Rumbek Centre County, the dominant clans are Agar Dinka. In Cueibet County, the dominant clan is the Gok Dinka. In the Yirol area including Yirol West County and Yirol East County are the Ciec Dinka and non-Dinka Atuot. Among these clans of the Dinka are sub-clans, such as the Athoi, Pakam, and Rup among the Agar Dinka, and the Macar among the Gok Dinka. A conflict between the Gony and Thuyic sub-clans of the Athoi sub-clan have been ongoing since 1994, mainly in Rumbek East.

Lakes State was disestablished in 2015 and replaced by Eastern Lakes State, Gok State, and Western Lakes State. Lakes State was re-established in February 2020, dissolving the previous three states.

=== Political history ===
Throughout the Second Sudanese Civil War, Lakes State and Rumbek in particular was a heavy support base for the Sudan Peoples' Liberation Army (SPLA), the main group fighting for South Sudanese independence. The SPLA was led by John Garang until the Nuer-majority SPLA-Nasir split off in 1991, with SPLA-Nasir fighters from Greater Upper Nile attacking pro-Garang Dinka communities in Lakes. Dinka communities formed gelweng (Note: Meaning cattle protectors.) militias to prevent cattle-rustling from the SPLA-Nasir. These gelweng eventually became local police figures and were loyal to the governor of the state.

However, gelweng were increasingly funded by cattle-rustling campaigns and prominent Dinka politicians at home and abroad, allowing these gelweng to obtain weapons more advanced than the South Sudanese Army (SSPDF). Many gelweng fighters are also soldiers of the SSPDF, bringing government involvement into inter-communal clashes. Disarmament campaigns by the South Sudanese government between 2006 and 2018 all failed. The heavy inter-communal conflicts between Dinka clans in Rumbek were a major faction in Garang's decision to keep Juba as the capital of South Sudan instead of moving it to Rumbek.

In 2018, the South Sudanese Civil War ended with the signing of the Revitalized Agreement on the Resolution of the Conflict in South Sudan (R-ARCSS). While this ended fighting between major factions like the SSPDF and the SPLM-IO, Lakes State communities unaffected by the agreement continued their conflicts. Between July 2018 and April 2019, there were 28 reported conflicts from cattle-raiding in Yirol East and Yirol West. Many large bouts of violence in Lakes State, like much of South Sudan, are the climax of a series of longstanding, often unreported, tit-for-tat feuds and revenge killings between communities.

== Conflicts ==
The first major flare-up of conflict occurred in the Amethic and Adior areas of Rumbek North County. (Note: Not all of the violent clashes have been reported by media, and there is little information on many conflicts or raids that have been the "start" of ballooned conflicts like that of the Agar Dinka in 2020.) This attack occurred on April 29, 2019, when an armed group of cattle raiders from Yirol East attacked pastoralists from the Pakam Agar Dinka community from Rumbek North in the village of Amak, on the border between Yirol East and Yirol West counties. Five people were killed in this attack, and an unknown number were injured. Inter-communal violence had been ongoing in Yirol since January 2019, but it is unknown how many people were killed.

On July 5, 2019, a raid by militiamen from Western Lakes state in the village of Alel in Gok State killed seven people and injured three others. This attack was allegedly in response to a prior cattle raid. On July 21, clashes between Gony and Thuyic sub-clans of the Agar Dinka in Western Lakes killed ten people and injured four others. This was perpetrated in response to an earlier attack against the Gony. Thirteen civilians were killed in Eastern Lakes by unidentified attackers on August 13. Two weeks later on August 31, eight SSPDF soldiers and two young men transporting cattle to Cueibet as payment for a blood killing were ambushed. Eleven people were killed and fourteen were wounded in Yirol East in September 2019 during clashes between Nuer and Dinka pastoralists.

On December 25, 2019, a cattle raid in Mudiriya in Gok killed six people and injured twelve others. Four days later in Western Bahr Naam in Western Lakes, two sub-groups of the Kok community held a peace reconciliation conference to end a seven-year long conflict.

=== Battle of Maper ===
On November 27, 2019, clashes broke out between the Gak and Manuer sub-sections of the Pakam Agar Dinka in the village of Maper. The clashes were kickstarted by the death of a trader killed by an "unspecified Pakam Dinka clan" the day prior. These clashes continued into November 29, instigating a deployment of 75 Nepalese UNMISS peacekeepers to Maper. ACLED reported that on the first day of the battle, 27 people were killed and 47 were injured. By November 29, this number had risen to 56 dead and over 100 injured, although some of the dead reported on the second day off fighting may have just died of their injuries from the first day of fighting.

The UNMISS peacekeepers deployed to Maper said at least 79 people were killed and 101 injured in the clashes. The UNMISS force commander, Shailesh Tinaikar and Gak paramount chief Manyiel Lieny both attested that the UNMISS deployment had halted the clashes and allowed peace talks to begin between the Gak and Manuer. However, clashes flared up again on December 28, killing 23 people.

=== Intra-Agar Dinka clashes ===
Starting on January 28, 2020, around the beginning of the dry season, (Note: According to ACLED, conflict traditionally peaks in the dry season and subsides in the rainy season. The dry season is usually from November to April, although this can vary.) the Athoi and Rup sub-sections of the Agar Dinka broke out in reliatory clashes in Yirol West and Rumbek East County. At least 53 people were killed in these clashes, and 40 more were injured. This conflict between the Athoi and Rup had been ongoing since November 2019, and by the end of February 2020 the ICRC said at least 250 people had been killed and 300 injured in Rumbek East as a result of the conflict.

Another bout of violence broke out on March 14, 2020, after the killing of two elderly men at Gun camp in Marial Bek in Rumbek Centre. These clashes involved multiple sub-clans of the Agar Dinka, including the Rup, Gony, (Note: Referred to elsewhere as Athoi.) Dhiei, Kuei, and Pakam. At least 40 people were killed in the Marial Bek clashes and 60 more injured. South Sudanese authorities knew about the conflict and risk of another violent series of attacks, but nothing was done about it. At least 2,738 people were displaced as a result of the February clashes.

Another round of violent clashes between Agar Dinka broke out in June 2020 in the Meen Waal area of Rumbek East, killing 33 people and injuring another 33. Violence subsided after the start of the rainy season and peace largely cemented itself after local Agar Dinka leaders came together to sign a peace agreement in Rumbek. A decrease was reported in IDPs in Lakes State between February 2020 and January 2021 by about 20,000, and a noticeable downward trend of violence occurred between September and November 2020 following spates of violence between June and August.

Further conflicts between the Gony and Thuyic sub-clans of the Athoi killed at least 23 people in Rumbek East and injured another 20 on April 18. These clashes took place in the villages of Kuet-douang, Mai-nyaleng, and Manyang-Riel. Around that same time, an Italian bishop was shot in Rumbek town.

The conflict between the Athoi and Rup Agar Dinka in Amongpiny and Cuei-gak payams in Rumbek Center and Rumbek East ended in May 2021 following UNMISS intermediation. Four people were killed and nine SSPDF soldiers injured in two ambushes.

=== Gok-Agar Dinka clashes ===
Much of the conflict between Gok and Agar Dinka militiamen began in December 2020, after the rainy season. These clashes between Gok and Agar Dinka took place in Cueibet and Rumbek Center counties. On March 8, 2021, fighting between Pakam Agar Dinka and Macar Gok Dinka in Ngap, in Cueibet County, left between 17 and 24 people dead. In June, another spate of violence broke out between Pakam and Rup Agar Dinka and Gok Dinka in Makerdheim cattle camp in Cueibet. At least 24 people were killed and 25 injured in this attack. The Pakam and Rup militiamen arrived in Cueibet from Rumbek North and Rumbek Center respectively.

=== Other conflicts ===
Occasional conflicts between Gok Dinka groups broke out in 2020, most often between the Macar sub-clan. Sub-sections of the Macar clashed in May 2020 in response to a gang-rape, leaving 29 people killed across two weeks of fighting. On December 9, after the rainy season, 15 people were killed and 17 were injured. Some SSPDF soldiers fought in this clash.

Twenty people were killed in fighting in Atuot communities in Anuol payam in Yirol West on April 22, 2021. In June 2021, unknown gunmen ambushed a marked humanitarian aid convoy in Yirol West, leading to the deaths of two aid workers.

== De-escalation ==
After the re-establishment of Lakes State in 2020, Makur Kulang Liei, a former county commissioner for Yirol West and well-known military commander from the same county, was appointed governor of Lakes. Kulang was unable to effectively control the communal violence in his state, and was replaced by military commander Rin Tueny Mabor in June 2021. Tueny was known for being well-liked by the SSPDF and SPLM-IO, and had previously served as head of military intelligence for the SSPDF from 2019 until his appointment as governor. As head of military intelligence, Tueny was known for his use of extrajudicial torture and killings, particularly of suspected SPLM-IO sympathizers.

One of Tueny's first acts as governor was the foundation of the "Lakes First" agenda to assemble community leaders. (Note: The Lakes First agenda was named after American president Donald Trump's America First slogan.) This agenda resulted in 27 peace resolutions. Tueny utilized SSPDF and government-aligned gelweng militias to curb the violence, banking on an already-prevalent SSPDF force in the state. President Salva Kiir even authorized Tueny to "use any means necessary to stabilize and pacify Lakes State." One of the ways that Tueny enforced peace in Lakes was the creation of new courts to judge cattle-related feuds, supported by national judges and UNMISS representatives.

Despite Tueny's efforts to curb violence being largely successful in rural areas, which made Lakes State one of the safest in South Sudan, his use of force in crushing conflicts spurred a rise in extra-judicial executions. While Tueny managed to mitigate the infighting in Lakes, during his tenure cross-border raiding spiked significantly. A 2023 Small Arms Survey report commented on Tueny's authoritarian practices with "Today, a majority of the population in Lakes state seems willing to accept the trade-off between the improvements in the quality of daily life and the related undermining of human rights." Researcher Jan Pospisil questioned the sustainability of Tueny's security approach. According to Pospisil the youth involved in the cattle rustling are starting to consider that "the socio-economic rewards gained by raiding to outweigh the risk of being targeted by security forces".
