= List of cities in South Sudan =

Cities of South Sudan

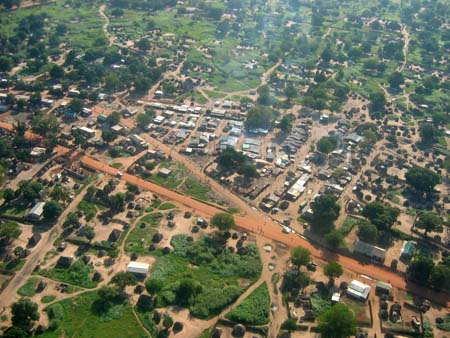
Juba, capital of South Sudan

The population estimates for cities in South Sudan are for 2010, except where otherwise indicated. The references from which the estimated populations are sourced are listed in each article for the cities where the population estimates are given. This list is not comprehensive.

== List ==
City	Population	County	State
Abyei (Note: The status of Abyei is contested as of the date of South Sudanese independence – 9 July 2011.)	20,000		Abyei Area
Akobo	11,000	Akobo County	Jonglei State
Aweil	38,745	Aweil Center County	Northern Bahr el Ghazal
Bentiu (Bantiu)	7,700	Rubkona County	Unity State
Bor	26,782	Bor County	Jonglei State
Gogrial	44,600	Gogrial West County	Warrap State
Juba	450,000	Juba County	Central Equatoria State
Kuajok (Kuacjok, Kwajok)	78,000	Gogrial West County	Gogrial State
Malakal	160,765	Malakal County	Upper Nile State
Nimule	45,000	Magwi County	Eastern Equatoria
Pajok	49,000	Magwi County	Eastern Equatoria
Rumbek	32,083	Rumbek Central County	Lakes State
Makol-Chuei	17,340	Bor county	Jonglei state
Torit	20,050	Torit County	Eastern Equatoria
Wau	127,384	Wau County	Western Bahr el Ghazal
Wanyjok (Winejok)	300,000	Aweil East County	Northern Bahr el Ghazal
Yambio	40,382	Yambio County	Western Equatoria State
Yei	260,720	Yei River	Central Equatoria State
Yirol	11,650	Yirol West County	Lakes State

== See also ==
- States of South Sudan
- List of cities in Sudan
- List of cities in East Africa
