= Yirol Airport =

- IATA: n/a; ICAO: HSYL

Summary
- Airport type: Public, Civilian
- Owner: Civil Aviation Authority of South Sudan
- Serves: Yirol, South Sudan
- Location: Yirol, South Sudan
- Elevation AMSL: 1,434 ft / 437 m
- Coordinates: 06°33′36″N 30°30′36″E

Map
- Location of Yirol Airport in South Sudan

Runways
Direction	Length		Surface
Direction	ft	m	Surface
			Unpaved

Yirol Airport is an airport in South Sudan. It has a single unpaved runway.

== Location ==
Yirol Airport (IATA: n/a, ICAO: HSYL) is located in Yirol West County in Lakes State, in the town of Yirol, in the Bahr el Ghazal Region of South Sudan. The airport is located to the immediate north of the central business district of the town.

This location lies approximately 224 kilometres (139 mi), by air, northwest of Juba International Airport, the largest airport in South Sudan. The geographic coordinates of this airport are: 6° 33' 36.60"N, 30° 30' 36.00"E (Latitude:6.5600; Longitude:30.5100). Bentiu Airport sits at an elevation of 437 metres (1,434 ft) above sea level.

== Overview ==
Yirol Airport is a small civilian airport that serves the town of Yirol and surrounding communities. The airport does not yet have regular scheduled airline service.

== Accidents ==
In September 2018 a Let L-410 Turbolet aeroplane on final approach to land at the airport lost contact with controllers. The aircraft was found to have crashed into nearby Lake Yirol. It is thought that the pilots became disorientated in fog. There were 23 people on board the aircraft, of whom 20 were killed, including both pilots. The passengers killed included a Red Cross official, a government representative, two army officers, and the Bishop of Yirol, the Rt Revd Simon Adut Yuang.

Initial reports stated that four people had survived, including two children and an Italian doctor. Some other reports stated there were three survivors, who were two young children and an Italian doctor. Several days after the crash the South Sudanese government stated that 20 people had died, and three had survived, one of whom was a flight attendant.

== See also ==
- Yirol
- Lakes State
- List of airports in South Sudan
