= South Sudan Civil Aviation Authority =

South Sudanese government agency

Agency overview
- Preceding agency: Sudan Civil Aviation Authority
- Headquarters: Juba International Airport
- Agency executive: Administrator (acting)
- Parent agency: Ministry of Transportation of South Sudan
- Website: www.sscaa.gov.ss

South Sudan Civil Aviation Authority (SSCAA) is the civil aviation authority of South Sudan. Its head office is located in Juba, the capital of South Sudan. The organization has been responsible for licensing, monitoring, and regulating civil aviation matters.

== History ==
In 2011, when South Sudan had announced its split from its northerly neighbor Sudan. The SSCAA was formed and officially recognized by the International Civil Aviation Organization as its 193rd Member.

President Salva Kiir officially signed the decree for the establishment of the countries first civil aviation authority to regulate the industry on February 26, 2013. Police general Agasio Akol was appointed as chairman of a seven-member board.

On May 24, 2021, the SSCAA announced to ground all privately owned Antonov An-26 being flown in South Sudan after a series of incidents involving those planes.

In July 2021, NavPass an aviation solutions provider and the SSCAA was able to launch a lower airspace using the global-standard Performance-based navigation (PBN) system that uses an AI-powered platform to record all flights in real time while automatically collecting overflight fees.

== Incidents ==
- 2015 Juba An-12 crash
- 2020 South West Aviation Antonov An-26 crash
- 2021 South Sudan Supreme Airlines Let L-410UVP-E crash
- 2025 Light Air Services Beechcraft 1900 crash
