= Western Lakes State =

State of South Sudan from 2015 to 2020

- State
- Location of Western Lakes in South Sudan
- Country: South Sudan
- Capital: Rumbek
- Number of Counties: 4

Government
  - Governor

Population (2014 Estimate)
  - Total: 546,240

Western Lakes was a state in South Sudan that existed between 2 October 2015 and 22 February 2020. It was located in the Bahr el Ghazal region and was part of the former state of Lakes State. It bordered Amadi State, Eastern Lakes State, Gbudwe State, Gok, Maridi State, Southern Liech State, and Tonj State.

== History ==
Before Western Lakes State was formed, it was part of Lakes State. On 2 October 2015, President Salva Kiir issued a decree establishing 28 states in place of the 10 constitutionally established states. The decree established the new states largely along ethnic lines. A number of opposition parties and civil society groups challenged the constitutionality of the decree. Kiir later resolved to take it to parliament for approval as a constitutional amendment. In November the South Sudanese parliament empowered President Kiir to create new states.

Abraham Makoi Bol was appointed as the governor on 24 December 2015. Makoi was removed from office on 27 February 2017 on the orders of President Kiir, with Matur Chut Dhuol being appointed as new governor. Chut had already served as governor of Lakes State before its dissolution.

== Geography ==
Western Lakes State is located in the Bahr el Ghazal region and it borders the states of Tonj to the north and west, Southern Liech to the northeast, Maridi to the south, Amadi to the southeast, Gbudwe and Gok to the west, and Eastern Lakes to the east.

=== Climate ===
Rumbek has a tropical savanna climate. It is warm every month with both a wet and dry season. The average annual temperature for Rumbek is 35° degrees and there is about 551 mm of rain in a year. It is dry for 171 days a year with an average humidity of 52% and an UV-index of 7

=== Administrative divisions ===
After the split up, Western Lakes State broke down even further for a total of 9 counties in the state. The 9 counties are part of the 180 counties in South Sudan. The 9 counties are consisted of the following:

- Former Rumbek Center County:
  - Amongping; headquarters: Amongpiny
  - Malek; headquarters: Malek
  - Rumbek; headquarters: Rumbek
- Former Rumbek East County:
  - Eastern Bhar Naam; headquarters: Aduel
  - Western Bhar Naam; headquarters: Pacong
- Former Rumbek North County:
  - Aloor; headquarters: Maper
  - Malueth; headquarters: Meen
- Former Wulu County:
  - Bhargel; headquarters: Bhargel
  - Wulu; headquarters: Wulu

The counties are further sub-divided into payams, and the payams are then further sub-divided into bomas.

=== Towns and cities ===
The capital of the state is Rumbek. Rumbek, with an estimated population of 32,083 in 2011, is located 303 kilometers (188 miles) from Juba via air.
