= List of purpose-built national capitals =

Purpose-built capital cities

This is a list of capital cities that were specially designed, planned, and built to be a national or regional capital.

== Built ==
=== Current national capitals ===
City	Country	Date	Notes
Abuja	Nigeria	1991	In 1976, Nigeria's military government made plans for a new capital city. In 1991, it was moved from Lagos to provide a capital that was independent of the three major ethnic groups, the Yoruba, Igbo, and Hausa-Fulani, in an area in the country's interior. A new capital granted relief to the congestion and overcrowding of Lagos.
Ankara (Note: Modern parts of the city are placed beside or within old cities.)	Turkey	1923	Having served as the capital of the ancient Celtic state (280–64 BC) and Roman province of Galatia (25 BC–7th century), on 23 April 1920, the Grand National Assembly of Turkey was established in Ankara. Ankara became the new Turkish capital on the establishment of the Republic on 29 October 1923, succeeding the former Turkish capital Constantinople, now known as Istanbul.
Astana	Kazakhstan	1998	After Kazakhstan became independent following the dissolution of the Soviet Union, the city's original name was restored in the modified form Akmola. On 6 July 1994, the Supreme Council of Kazakhstan adopted the decree "On the transfer of the capital of Kazakhstan". On 10 December 1997, the capital was moved to Akmola, which was then renamed Astana in 1998. On 10 June 1998, Astana was proclaimed the capital. On 16 July 1999, Astana was awarded the medal and title City of Peace by UNESCO.
Baghdad	Iraq	762	Victorious Abbasid rulers wanted their own capital to rule from. Choosing a site north of Ctesiphon, the capital of the defeated Sasanian Empire (and also just north of where ancient Babylon once stood), on 30 July 762 the caliph Al-Mansur commissioned the construction of the city.
Belmopan	Belize	1970	In 1970, the capital of Belize was moved to Belmopan after 1961's Hurricane Hattie caused extensive damage to the former capital Belize City.
Brasília	Brazil	1960	Between 1763 and 1960, the capital of Brazil was the city of Rio de Janeiro. However, historical and internal developments in the country during the 1950s led to the revival of a project that had been envisioned for over 150 years. As a result, the new capital was built in a politically neutral and central location, aiming to avoid internal political tensions. Moreover, since national development had been largely concentrated along the coast, the decision also sought to reduce the vulnerability of governmental institutions to external attacks and to promote greater territorial integration (as was stated in the Brazilian constitution in 1891) and to eliminate the vulnerability to attacks by sea. In addition, ongoing demands were placing a heavy burden on Rio de Janeiro, further justifying the need for a new administrative center.
Bridgetown	Barbados	1628	Moved from James Town to Bridgetown in 1628, due to better topography for a better shipping harbor.
Canberra	Australia	1927	The Australian federal constitution adopted in 1901 required a new capital to be situated within the state of New South Wales but at least 100 miles (160 km) from the country's two largest cities, Sydney and Melbourne. The city's neutrality also served to ease the rivalry between the two cities. The Australian Capital Territory was created in 1911 and Canberra was formally established in 1913; however it was not until 1927, with the relocation of federal parliament, that it was designated as the capital.
Ciudad de la Paz	Equatorial Guinea	2026	In January 2026, Ciudad de la Paz replaced Malabo as Equatorial Guinea's capital city, having been under construction since 2017.
Dodoma	Tanzania	1996	Moved from Dar es Salaam.
Gaborone	Botswana	1964	In 1964, it moved from Mahikeng, South Africa, when Botswana became an independent country.
Islamabad	Pakistan	1960	In 1960, the capital was temporarily shifted from Karachi to Rawalpindi, the move being completed in 1966. Once it was ready, Islamabad became the capital. It was created to diversify development across the country, rather than for it to be centered in the south, along the Arabian Sea coast.
Lima	Peru	1535	Moved in 1535. Cuzco had been the inland capital of the Inca Empire, but when the Spanish Empire conquered Peru, Lima was founded, on the Pacific Ocean. Lima was consciously founded with the main aim of streamlining the logistics of Peruvian exports, taking advantage of its coastal location to connect the Andean interior with overseas markets. It was founded by Francisco Pizarro to take advantage of being closer to the Isthmus of Panama and the Spanish Empire's colonies in North America and to be more distant from the war-torn highlands of Peru.
Naypyidaw	Myanmar	2005	In 2005, it was moved from Yangon (Rangoon) to have the military government more centrally located, "so as to keep an eye on" rebel groups forming, and training for coups in the jungles and away from the political activities of Yangon.
New Delhi	India	1912	In 1912, the capital was moved from Calcutta (now Kolkata) to New Delhi, a newly established administrative district within Delhi which had previously served as the capital of the Mughal Empire.
Ngerulmud	Palau	2006	In 2006, the capital was moved from Koror City.
Nouakchott	Mauritania	1958	In 1958, the capital was moved from Saint-Louis, Senegal by President Moktar Ould Daddah.
Oslo (formerly Christiania)	Norway	1624	After a fire devastated medieval Oslo in 1624, King Christian IV ordered the city to be rebuilt further west, closer to the fortress, and renamed Christiania. Beginning in 1859, the former site of Oslo has been included in the city's borders. The city re-adopted the name Oslo in 1925.
Palikir	Federated States of Micronesia	1989	In 1989, moved from Kolonia.
Pretoria	South Africa	1860	Pretoria was founded in 1855 by Marthinus Pretorius, a leader of the Voortrekkers, who named it after his father Andries Pretorius. He chose a spot on the banks of the Apies rivier (Afrikaans for "Monkeys river") to be the new capital of the South African Republic (Dutch: Zuid Afrikaansche Republiek; ZAR).
Putrajaya	Malaysia	2002	In February 2001, Putrajaya was designated as the administrative capital of Malaysia. The executive branch of government (Cabinet, federal ministries and agencies) and the seat of the judiciary were moved from Kuala Lumpur to Putrajaya. However, Kuala Lumpur remains the official capital and is still the seat of the head of state and legislative branch (Parliament of Malaysia).
Seoul	South Korea	1394	Joseon's first King, Taejo, planned the construction of the Hanyang city in October 1394, to replace Gaegyeong, old Goryeo's capital city. Government buildings were planned to be crowded along the street in front of the main palace Gyeongbokgung, to implement instructions from Confucian ideology. This traditional city center of Hanyang is part of modern Downtown Seoul.
St. John's (Note: de facto)	Antigua and Barbuda	1668	The city was laid out following the 1666 French invasion due to its strategic location on St. John's Harbour. The legislative council authorised the construction of a town in April 1668, and by September 1675, St. John's was one of six official towns on the island. Prior to this, Falmouth was the de facto capital.
Valletta	Malta	1571	In 1571, as a result of the Great Siege of Malta six years earlier, the capital was moved from Birgu to Valletta. The new capital city was built on the Sciberras Peninsula between 1566 and 1571, and was named for the Grandmaster Jean Parisot de Valette.
Washington, D.C.	United States	1800	In 1800, the capital of the United States was moved here from its temporary capital in Philadelphia, after years of construction in the federal District of Columbia. The U.S. Constitution had authorized the federal government to set aside a federal district as a national capital. The move was part of the Compromise of 1790 between Thomas Jefferson and Alexander Hamilton allowing the U.S. Department of the Treasury to assume state governments' debts as a national debt in exchange for locating the capital in the South. Virginia and Maryland each ceded land for the capital.
Wellington	New Zealand	1865	In 1863, it was proposed that the capital be moved to a location on the shores of Cook Strait to better unify the country and provide greater accessibility for the South Island. An independent tribunal visited several potential sites and ultimately selected Wellington due to its central location, sheltered harbor, and defensible position. The land in the region was purchased from Iwi for this purpose.
Yamoussoukro	Ivory Coast	1983	In 1983, moved from Abidjan.

==== Subnational ====
City	Administrative unit	Parental country	Date	Notes
Austin	Texas	United States	1839	The Republic of Texas (1839–1847) had five temporary capitals and one official capital, Houston, before its second president Mirabeau B. Lamar moved the capital to the new city of Austin.
Indianapolis	Indiana	United States	1821	When Indiana became a state in 1816, the capital was in the southern town of Corydon, but in 1820 the Indiana General Assembly approved a move to a purpose-built city roughly at the state's center. Indianapolis was founded at the chosen site in 1821 and became the state capital in 1825.
La Plata	Buenos Aires Province	Argentina	1882	La Plata was planned and developed to serve as the provincial capital after the city of Buenos Aires was federalized in 1880. It was officially founded by Governor Dardo Rocha on 19 November 1882.
Lelystad	Flevoland	Netherlands	1967	
Palmas	Tocantins	Brazil	1989	
Zhongxing	Taiwan	Republic of China	1956	Zhongxing New Village became the capital of Taiwan Province of the Republic of China in 1956 after Taipei, which became the ROC's provisional capital from 1949, moved its Taiwan Provincial Government to that location; but continued to exist until 2018.

=== Historical ===
City	Country	Date	Notes
Akhetaten	Ancient Egypt (New Kingdom)	1346 BC	Established by Pharaoh Akhenaten of the Eighteenth Dynasty. Abandoned in 1332 BC, shortly after his death. Now known as "Amarna" from the name of the archaeological site.
Ava (Inwa)	Ava Kingdom	1365	Founded in 1365, Ava (Inwa) was the capital of successive Burmese kingdoms from the 14th to 19th centuries.
Ayutthaya	Ayutthaya Kingdom (Thailand)	1350	Founded by Uthong after a smallpox outbreak in Lop Buri in 1350
Constantinople	Roman Empire	330	Established by Constantine the Great to be a capital for the Eastern Roman Empire. After the fall of the Western Roman Empire, it became the only capital of the empire. Established on the site of old Byzantium, the new city almost completely replaced the old one. After the fall of the Byzantine Empire in 1453 it was renamed Istanbul and became the capital of the Ottoman Empire until its dissolution after World War I, when the Republic of Turkey established its new capital in Ankara. It also served as the capital of the Latin Empire after the Fourth Crusade in the 13th century.
Dur-Sharrukin	Assyria (Neo-Assyrian Empire)	706 BC	Established by Sargon II and under construction over the course of his reign, it was only the official capital until 705 with Sargon II's untimely death. His son, Sennacherib moved the capital to Nineveh.
Fujiwara-kyō	Japan	694	In 694, the capital was moved there from Asuka, but moved out to Nara in 710.
Itjtawy	Ancient Egypt (Middle Kingdom)	1971 BC	Established by Pharaoh Amenemhat I of the Twelfth Dynasty. Remained capital through the Thirteenth Dynasty; abandoned during or shortly after the reign of Merneferre Ay for unknown reasons. Exact site is unclear but usually linked to the archaeological site of Lisht.
Kar-Tukulti-Ninurta	Assyria (Middle Assyrian Empire)	1233 BC	Established by Tukulti-Ninurta I, and named after him. It remained the capital during his lifetime, but was largely abandoned after his death, with the capital moving back to Assur in 1207 BC.
Kyoto	Japan	794	In 794, the capital was moved from Nagaokakyō to Kyoto, but it was moved again to Tokyo (Edo) in about 1868, when the Emperor of Japan moved during the Meiji Restoration and the end of the Tokugawa Shogunate. (see article capital of Japan).
Karlsruhe	Baden-Durlach (modern-day Germany)	1715	In 1715, the capital was moved from Durlach to Karlsruhe, which became the capital of the unified Baden in 1771. Karlsruhe remained the capital of the Grand Duchy of Baden after German unification following the Franco-Prussian War of 1871; it ceased being the capital of any territorial entity in 1945, at the end of World War II.
Mandalay	Burma	1859	Mandalay was built during 1857–1859 by King Mindon, and it was the last royal capital of the Burmese Kingdom. The site was chosen in accordance to a supposed prophecy by The Buddha. Mandalay is now the second largest city in Myanmar.
Nimrud	Assyria (Neo-Assyrian Empire)	879 BC	Originally a trading settlement, by the reign of Ashurnasirpal II it had fallen into disrepair and was torn down to be rebuilt to function as his new capital. It remained as the imperial capital from 879 to 706 BCE, when Sargon II shifted the seat of government to his newly founded city, Dur-Sharrukin.
Pasargadae	Achaemenid Empire	6th century BC	Established by Cyrus the Great. The exact extent and function of the capital is unclear. Possibly abandoned after the establishment of Persepolis by Darius the Great.
Persepolis	Achaemenid Empire	6th century BC	Established by Darius the Great. The exact extent and function of the capital is unclear; its functions appear mostly ceremonial and it may have been occupied only seasonally. Nevertheless usually cited as capital of the Achaemenid Empire by most contemporary sources.
Pi-Ramesses	Ancient Egypt (New Kingdom)	13th century BC	Established by Pharaoh Ramesses II of the Nineteenth Dynasty. The exact year in which the capital was moved is unclear, but it is known to have occurred before the end of Ramesses II's 66-year reign in 1213 BC. Remained capital through the Twentieth Dynasty; abandoned c. 1060 BC due to silting of the branch of the Nile on which it was situated. Exact site is unclear but usually linked to the archaeological site of Qantir.
Pinya	Pinya Kingdom	7 February 1313	Founded in 1313, Pinya was the capital of the central Burmese kingdom of Pinya from 1313 to 1365.
Pella	Ancient Macedonia	c. 400 BC	Moved from Aigai due to more fertile land and suitable location for a port, connected to the sea by a navigable inlet.
Quezon City	Philippines	1948	The city was created in 1939 by President Manuel L. Quezon. In 1948, the capital was moved from Manila to the new, neighbouring city. However, the capital was reverted to Manila in 1976.
Saint Petersburg	Russian Empire	1712	Built by Peter the Great in the beginning of the 18th century on territory captured from Sweden in the Great Northern War, capital since 1712. The Bolsheviks finally settled on Moscow in 1918.
Sigtuna	Sweden	970	Following the decline and burning of the nearby trading hub of Birka, Sigtuna was deliberately established to replace it as a central political, commercial, and royal seat. The capital was later moved to Uppsala and Stockholm in the 13th century.
Victoria City	Hong Kong	1841	Stanley was the temporary administrative centre until the colonial government moved to the newly built Victoria City.

== Currently proposed or under construction ==
City	Country	Date	Notes
Makran	Iran	TBA	The southern coastal region of Makran is expected to replace Tehran as its national capital of Iran due to both population overcrowding and vulnerability to earthquakes.
The New Capital	Egypt	TBA	In March 2015, Egypt proposed building a The New Capital, currently undergoing a naming process. It is now under construction and lies east of the present capital Cairo. The city is projected to be home to more than 40 million people by 2050.
Nusantara	Indonesia	TBA (Note: Prabowo Subianto signed the Law No. 151/2024 at 30 November 2024, revoking Jakarta as a capital, but not occur because of delays. So he sets the limit to 17 August 2028. While former president Joko Widodo issued an order to move civil servants to Nusantara no later than January 2025.)	Nusantara has been under construction since July 2022 and is expected to replace Jakarta as the capital of Indonesia. For decades, Indonesia has mulled the relocation of its capital from Jakarta, which is overcrowded and subsiding rapidly. On 26 August 2019, President Joko Widodo announced that the future Indonesian capital would be carved from Penajam North Paser and Kutai Kartanegara regencies in East Kalimantan province. The proposed capital was named Nusantara on 16 January 2022.
Ramciel	South Sudan	TBA	In February 2011, the Autonomous Government of Southern Sudan adopted a resolution to study moving the capital of the new Republic of South Sudan that was to be created in July of that year to a new, planned city. In September 2011, the government of South Sudan approved a project to build a new capital at Ramciel in Lakes state; it is projected that the project will take at least five years.
Sejong City	South Korea	partially moved since 2014	Sejong Government Complex finished in 2014. Some authorities already moved from Seoul

=== Subnational ===
City	Administrative unit	Parental country	Date	Notes
Arawa	Bougainville	Papua New Guinea	TBA (Note: The city of Arawa was first built in 1970 (right before the Bougainville civil war incident).)	The town was largely destroyed during the Bougainville Civil War, resulting in the relocation of the capital to Buka, though there are plans to rebuild Arawa and make it the capital again.
Little Bay	Montserrat	United Kingdom	TBA	Little Bay is a town under construction in Montserrat, intended to replace the previous capital, Plymouth, which was destroyed by the eruption of the Soufrière Hills volcano in 1997.

== Former proposals and attempts ==
- Welthauptstadt Germania was the proposed renewal of Berlin, (Nazi Germany) as a planned "world capital", although only a small portion was built between 1937 and 1943. Many of the plans were designed by Albert Speer. Progress was halted by the failure of Operation Barbarossa during World War II.
- Al-Karamah was intended to be the permanent capital of the United Arab Emirates located between Abu Dhabi and Dubai, but it was never built.
- Viedma, the capital of the Río Negro Province, was proposed by President Raúl Alfonsín as a new capital for Argentina in 1986, replacing Buenos Aires. The idea was to change the centralization in the port of Buenos Aires, and promote development in Patagonia. The economic collapse of the Alfonsín government halted the project that had been approved by Law.

== See also ==
- List of national capitals
- Planned community
