= 2018 South West Aviation Let L-410 crash =

Plane crash in South Sudan

2018 South West Aviation Let L-410 Turbolet crash
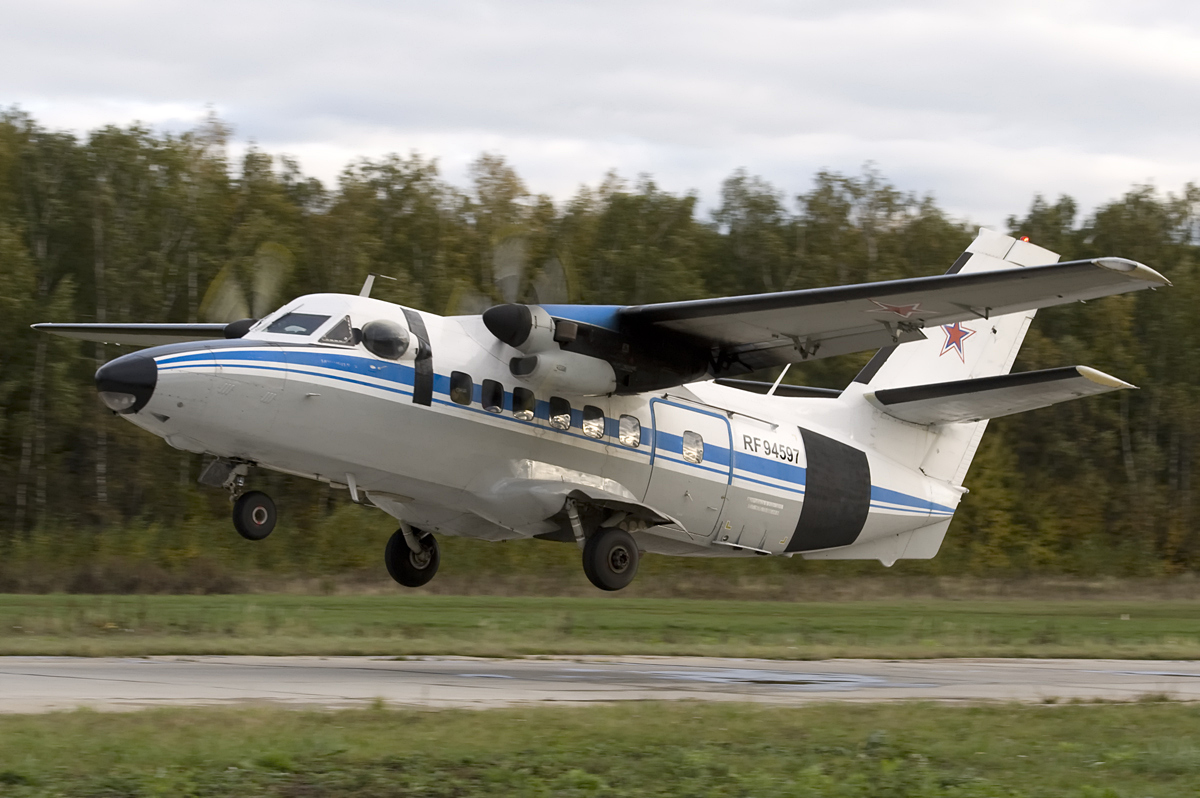
- A Let L-410 Turbolet similar to the accident aircraft.

Accident
- Date: September 9, 2018
- Summary: Controlled flight into terrain caused by pilot error and bad weather
- Site: Lake Yirol, near Yirol Airport, South Sudan; 6°34′32.6″N 30°29′46.3″E

Aircraft
- Aircraft type: Let L-410UVP
- Operator: South West Aviation
- Registration: UR-TWO
- Flight origin: Juba International Airport
- Destination: Yirol Airport
- Occupants: 23
- Passengers: 20
- Crew: 3
- Fatalities: 20
- Survivors: 3

On 9 September 2018, en route from Juba International Airport in South Sudan to Yirol Airport, a Let L-410 Turbolet aircraft crashed, carrying a total of 23 passengers and crew, of which 20 were killed on impact, including the Anglican Bishop of Yirol, Simon Adut Yuang. The small plane crashed into Lake Yirol amid heavy fog and poor visibility.

== Aircraft history ==
The aircraft, registered UR-TWO, leased by Ukrainian carrier Slav-Air for South Sudan-based South West Aviation, had been delivered to Aeroflot in 1984, then transferred to various operators until 2006, when it was placed in storage in Rivne, Ukraine. In April 2018, the plane was acquired by Slav-Air and leased since May.

The Let 410 UVP had landed in Juba on the same morning as the accident, piloted by a different crew from the one that would then conduct the flight to Yirol.

== Accident ==
On 9 September 2018 at 08:00 local time (05:00 UTC), the Let 410 took off from Juba International Airport with destination Yirol Airport, at approximately 122 NM, for an estimated flight time of 45 minutes.

On-board the flight deck were two Sudanese crew members. Captain Sami Qeily (57), and First Officer Mohamed Shamseddine (27), were the pilot-in-command and second-in-command, respectively. While both of their flight time logs were destroyed in the crash, they were rated in flying the Let-410.

== Investigation ==
Despite the Flight Data Recorder being recovered on 10 September and the Cockpit Voice Recorder on 30 September, reading out any information on the two devices was impossible as the recording tapes had run out and had not been replaced. The investigation conducted, based on analyses of the wreckage and interviews with witnesses, allowed the accident to be classified as a controlled flight into terrain (CFIT) and the causes of the accident to be traced back to a series of factors:

- The airline did not bother to acquire the weather briefings to give to the crew.
- Taking into account the worsening weather conditions, the pilots should have diverted the flight to an alternate airport but instead continued to fly towards the intended destination despite poor visibility.
- The on-board altimeter was adjusted to an incorrect pressure value, providing higher-than-real altitude indications. The instrument, recovered from the wreckage on the ground, in fact indicated 1,780 ft.

== See also ==
- List of accidents and incidents involving the Let L-410 Turbolet
