= Simon Adut Yuang =

South Sudanese Anglican bishop (died 2018)

- Bishop of Yirol
- Church: Episcopal Church of South Sudan
- Province: Province of the Episcopal Church of South Sudan
- Diocese: Yirol
- Elected: May 2015
- In office: 2015–2018
- Predecessor: Daniel Deng Abeil
- Successor: (vacant or unknown)

Orders
- Consecration: July 2015

Personal details
- Died: September 9, 2018 Yirol, South Sudan
- Denomination: Anglican
- Spouse: Yes
- Children: 6

Simon Adut Yuang (died 9 September 2018) was a South Sudanese Anglican bishop. He served as the Anglican Bishop of Yirol, located within the Province of the Episcopal Church of South Sudan, from 2015 until his death in a plane crash on 9 September, 2018.

In January 2015, the incumbent Bishop of Yirol, Daniel Deng Abeil, died from cancer. Simon Adut Yuang was elected as Deng Abeil's successor in May 2015. He was consecrated and enthroned as Bishop of Yirol in July 2015.

Simon Adut Yuang was killed in a plane crash in Yirol on September 9, 2018, along with at least 19 passengers and crew. The plane was en route from Juba International Airport to Yirol Airport when it crashed into Lake Yirol.

Bishop Simon Adut Yuang was survived by his wife and six children.
