= Akol Paul Kordit =

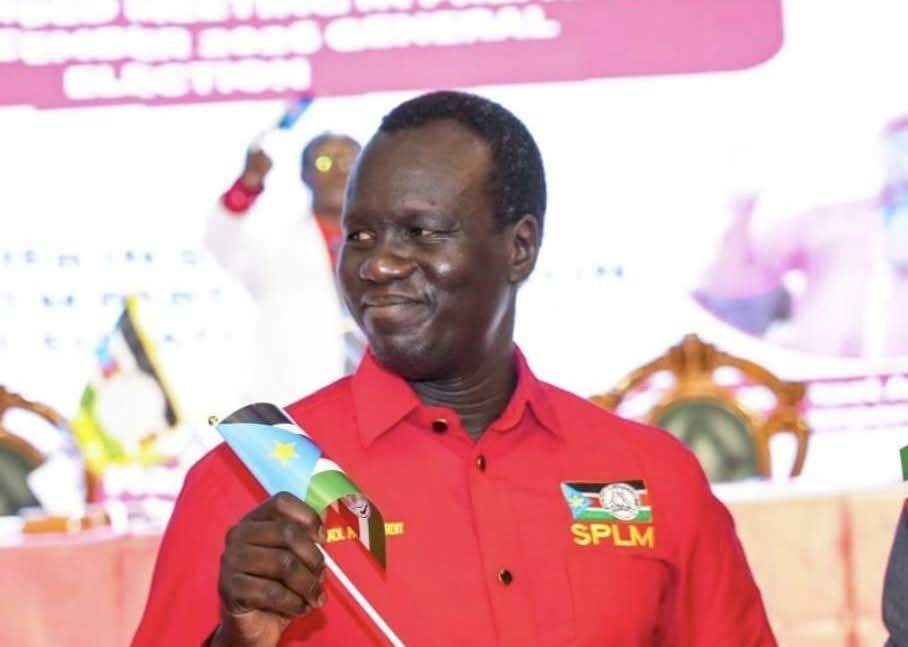
- Akol Paul Kordit holding South Sudan's flag at an SPLM event, 2026.

Secretary General of the Sudan People's Liberation Movement
- Incumbent
- Assumed office 18 November 2025
- Preceded by: Paul Logale

First Deputy Secretary General of the SPLM
- In office 2024–2025

Deputy Minister of Information, Telecommunication and Postal Services
- In office 2017 – February 2018
- President: Salva Kiir

Member of the Transitional National Legislative Assembly
- Constituency: Western Lakes State

Personal details
- Born: Rumbek, Lakes State, South Sudan
- Party: Sudan People's Liberation Movement (SPLM)
- Profession: Electrical Engineer, Politician

Akol Paul Kordit is a South Sudanese politician and senior leader of the Sudan People's Liberation Movement (SPLM) who hails from Rumbek, Lakes State. He currently serves as the Secretary General of the SPLM, the ruling party of South Sudan. He was appointed by party chairman and President Salva Kiir on 12 November 2025. In 2021 Facebook post of the U.S. Embassy Juba, South Sudan, the embassy cliamed that Akol Paul Kordit was the first South Sudanese to be Fulbright PhD Visiting Scholar at Marxe School of Public and International Affairs in University of New York, where he completed his PhD studies.

== Career ==
=== Deputy Minister of Information (2017–2018) ===
Following his departure from the Youth League, Kordit was appointed Deputy Minister of Information, Telecommunication and Postal Services in South Sudan's Transitional Government of National Unity. He also represented Western Lakes State in the national legislative assembly. In March 2017, he was stripped of delegated powers by minister Michael Makuei amid reported internal ministry disputes. He was subsequently dismissed from the deputy ministerial post by a presidential decree in February 2018, with the state broadcaster announcing the decision without citing reasons.

=== SPLM Leadership ===
==== Youth League Chairperson ====
Akol Paul Kordit served as the first Chairperson of the SPLM Youth League in 2005, the youth wing of the ruling SPLM, for a period spanning more than two decades, making him one of the longest-serving youth leaders in South Sudanese political history. He became one of the prominent voices for youth mobilisation and national unity. In 2014, speaking at a large SPLM youth rally in Yambio, Western Equatoria, Kordit called on South Sudanese youth to reject tribalism and unite behind principles of peace and national cohesion. He was removed from the Youth League chairpersonship in 2017.

==== First Deputy Secretary General for Political Affairs and Mobilization ====
Following the party's post-civil-war restructuring, Akol Paul Kordit was confirmed by Salva Kiir, the chairperson of SPLM as SPLM First Deputy Secretary General for Political Affairs and Mobilization, serving under Secretary General Peter Lam Both. The confirmation came after SPLM leadership meeting in South Sudan capital city, Juba.

In March 2023, Salva Kiir replaced Kordit with Benjamin Bol Mel as the First Deputy Secretary General for Political Affairs and Mobilization.

==== Secretary General ====
On 12 November 2025, as part of a sweeping political reshuffle in which President Kiir also dismissed Benjamin Bol Mel as Vice President, Kordit was appointed Secretary General of the SPLM, succeeding Paul Logale.

Kordit was sworn in swearing-in ceremony took place on 18 November 2025 at the SPLM House in Juba, alongside the swearing-in of Dr James Wani Igga as First Deputy Chairman of the party. President Kiir tasked the newly installed leadership with mobilising support ahead of South Sudan's anticipated 2026 elections and reconnecting the party with its grassroots base.

== Public Statements ==
Party reform and ideology: In December 2025, speaking at the swearing-in of the SPLM National Women's League, Kordit called for an internal "intellectual liberation" within the ruling party, arguing that the movement must confront and overcome poverty, tribalism, and injustice before it can effectively lead the nation. He stated that "liberating yourself from those things" is the prerequisite for genuine nation-building.

Security and communal violence: In April 2026, speaking at funeral prayers for victims of the Khor Kaltan attack, Kordit warned that South Sudan risks failure as a nation if communities continue to arm themselves for protection. He argued that widespread communal armament threatens the goals of the country's liberation struggle and that no region can prosper in isolation.

Agriculture and food security: In February 2026, Kordit announced that the SPLM was prioritising agriculture as a strategic pathway to restore public confidence ahead of elections, meeting with the Deputy Minister of Agriculture to align government programmes with the party's policy agenda.

Healthcare funding: In March 2026, Kordit drew attention when he pushed back against international concerns over the withdrawal of foreign healthcare funding in South Sudan, invoking the country's history of self-reliance during the liberation struggle. His remarks generated criticism from public, opposition figures and health advocates.

Party political offices
Preceded by Paul Logale	Secretary General of the Sudan People's Liberation Movement; 2025–present	Succeeded by Incumbent
