= 2021 South Sudan Supreme Airlines Let L-410 crash =

Fatal airplane crash in South Sudan 2021

Coordinates: 8°N 30°E

2021 South Sudan Supreme Airlines Let L-410 Turbolet crash
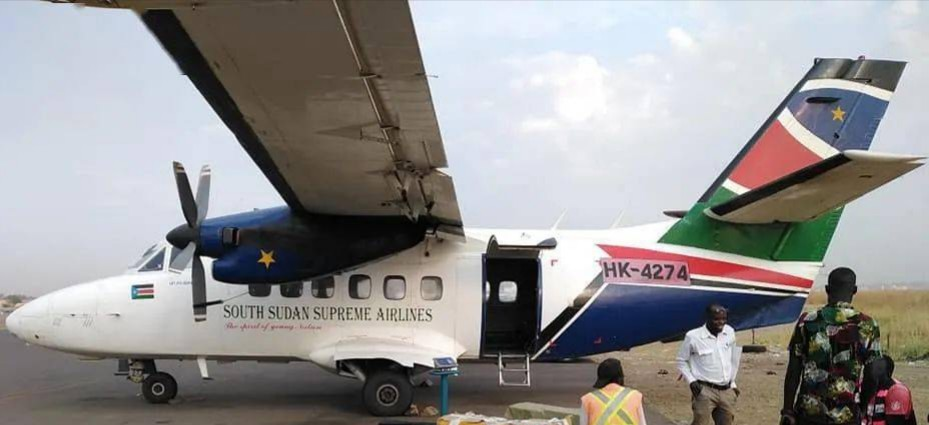
- The aircraft involved in the accident, picture taken in early 2021

Accident
- Date: 2 March 2021
- Summary: Engines failed after takeoff
- Site: Pieri Airstrip, Uror County, South Sudan

Aircraft
- Aircraft type: Let L-410 Turbolet
- Operator: South Sudan Supreme Airlines
- Registration: HK-4274 (fake), TR-KSS (fake), 5Y-SSA (pre)
- Flight origin: Pieri Airstrip, Uror County, South Sudan
- Destination: Yuai Airstrip, South Sudan
- Occupants: 10
- Passengers: 8
- Crew: 2
- Fatalities: 10
- Survivors: 0

On 2 March 2021, a Let L-410 Turbolet of South Sudan Supreme Airlines crashed in Pieri, Uror County, South Sudan on a domestic flight to Yuai Airstrip, South Sudan.

== Aircraft ==
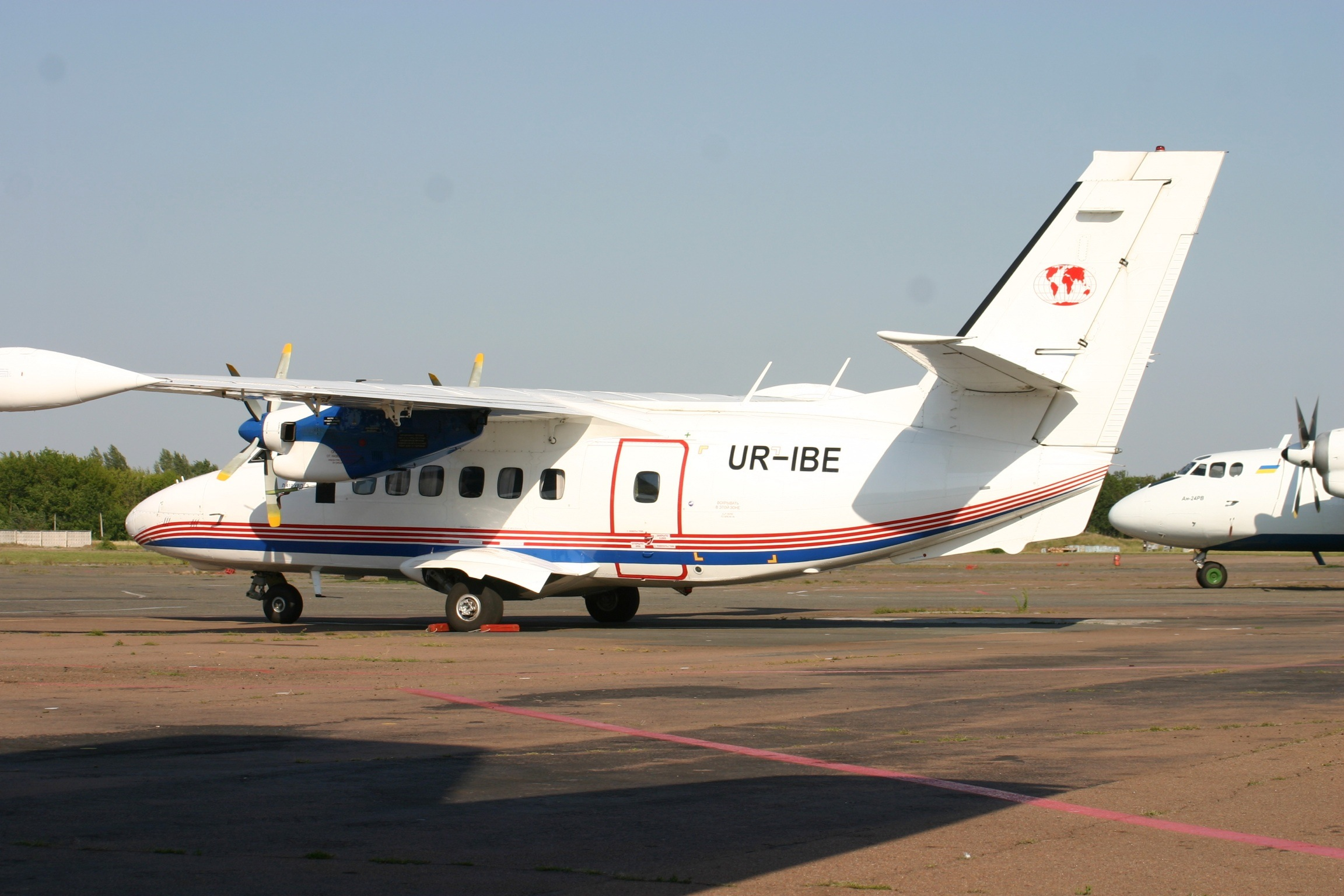
The aircraft involved in the accident in July 2007, while still in service with Business Aviation Center

The accident aircraft was a Let L-410 UVP-E, with the fake registration of HK-4274. The plane was the 1000th L-410 built and had previously been owned by Aeroflot, Universal-Avia, Business Aviation Center and Forty Eight Aviation. It was sold to South Sudan Supreme Airlines in 2017.

== Accident ==
The aircraft crashed immediately after taking off from Pieri Airstrip, South Sudan on a domestic scheduled passenger flight. There were 8 passengers, plus two crew on board. The South Sudan Civil Aviation Authority, who are investigating the accident, announced that the flight suffered from an engine failure about ten minutes after takeoff. The flight then attempted to turn back to land, but the other engine then failed, causing the plane to lose speed and crash with little forward motion, after likely stalling.

== Investigation ==
The South Sudan Civil Aviation Authority investigated the crash. According to director Kur Kuol, their initial finding suggested the crash was due to engine failure.
