= 2015 Juba Antonov An-12 crash =

Aviation disaster in Juba, South Sudan

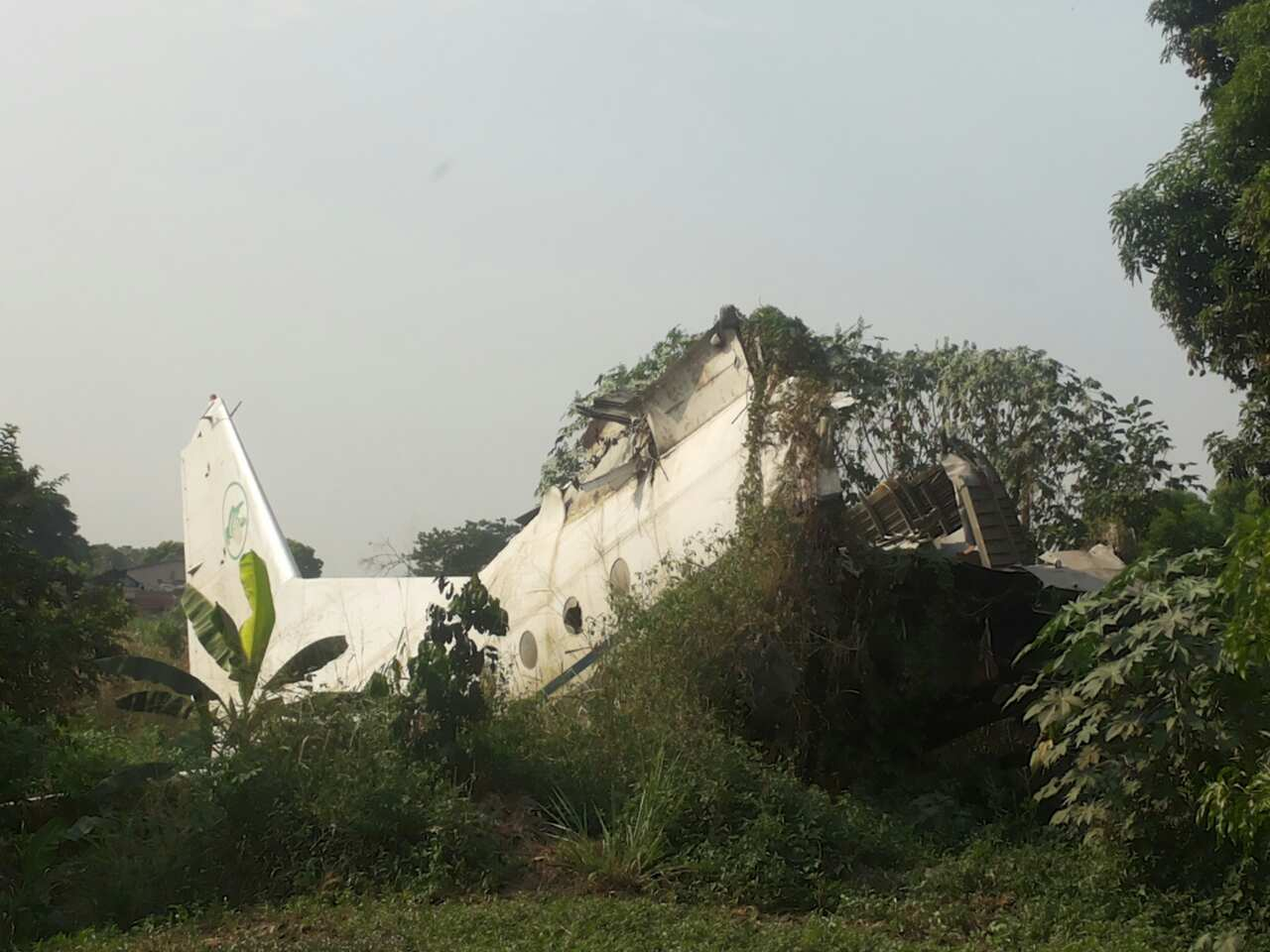
- The wreckage of the An-12 photographed at the crash site a year after the accident

Accident
- Date: 4 November 2015
- Summary: Under investigation, possible overloading
- Site: Near Juba International Airport, Juba, South Sudan; 4.86051°N 31.61751°E

Aircraft
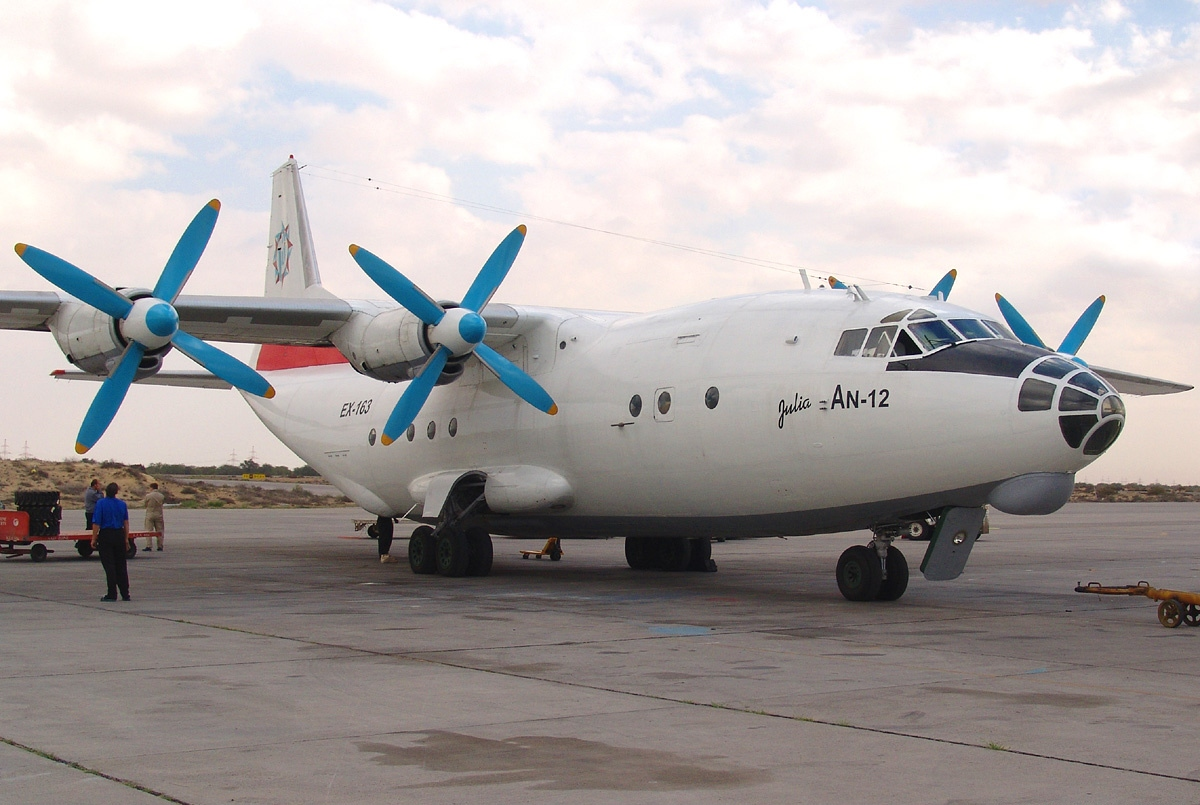
- The aircraft involved photographed in 2005 while in service with British Gulf International Airlines
- Aircraft type: Antonov An-12BK
- Operator: Allied Services Ltd
- Registration: EY-406
- Flight origin: Juba International Airport, Juba, South Sudan
- Destination: Paloich Airport, South Sudan
- Occupants: 39
- Passengers: 33
- Crew: 6
- Fatalities: 37
- Injuries: 2
- Survivors: 2

On 4 November 2015, an Antonov An-12 cargo aircraft crashed near the White Nile shortly after takeoff from Juba International Airport serving Juba, the capital city of South Sudan. At least 37 people were killed, including the crew of six. The crash is the deadliest aviation accident to have occurred in South Sudan since independence in 2011.

== Accident ==
Origin and destination airports in South Sudan

The aircraft was operating a cargo flight from Juba International Airport to Paloich Airport in the extreme northeastern South Sudan, an oil field. It departed Juba's runway 13 but impacted a hill about 1,100 metres (3,600 ft) past the runway end and came to rest on the banks of the White Nile.

Authorities in South Sudan reported that the aircraft was overloaded, with most of the passengers being oil workers. The government spokesman of South Sudan said that there were at least 18 people on board. Early reports of the number killed varied, but the total now stands at 37, according to South Sudan's Minister of Transportation, Kuong Danhier Gatluak. The crew of the plane comprised five Armenians and one Russian. There were initially three survivors, passenger Wuor Arop and an unrelated 13-month-old baby girl whom he had cradled, together with a third, reported to be a crew member, who later died in hospital. It is common for the security services to place family members on cargo planes to Paloich even if they are not on the manifest, according to Kenyi Galla, assistant operations manager for Combined Air Services, a company that operates chartered flights across South Sudan.

== Aircraft ==
The aircraft involved was an Antonov An-12BK with Tajikistani registration EY-406, serial number 01347704, built in 1971 by TAPOiCh of Soviet Union. It was operated by Allied Services Ltd, a logistics company based in South Sudan at Juba airport, leased from Tajikistan's Asia Airways.

== Investigation ==
An unnamed source at the Russian aviation agency said that the An-12 appeared to have been overloaded.

== See also ==
- 2020 Juba AN-26 crash
