= Eastern Lakes State =

State of South Sudan from 2015 to 2020

Eastern Lakes
- State
- Location of Eastern Lakes State within South Sudan
- Country: South Sudan
- Capital: Yirol
- Number of Counties: 15

Population (2014 Estimate)
  - Total: 335,130

Eastern Lakes State was a state in South Sudan that existed between 2 October 2015 and 22 February 2020. It was located in the Bahr el Ghazal region and it bordered Southern Liech to the north, Western States to the west, Amadi to the southwest, Terekeka to the southeast, and Jonglei to the east.

== History ==
On 2 October 2015, President Salva Kiir issued a decree establishing 28 states in place of the 10 constitutionally established states. The decree established the new states largely along ethnic lines. A number of opposition parties and civil society groups challenged the constitutionality of the decree. Kiir later resolved to take it to parliament for approval as a constitutional amendment. In November the South Sudanese parliament empowered President Kiir to create new states.

Rin Tuec was appointed Governor on 24 December.

== Geography ==
=== Administrative divisions ===
After the split up, Eastern Lakes State broke down even further for a total of 8 counties in the state; later 11 and recently 15. The 15 counties are part of the 180 counties in South Sudan. The 15 counties are consisted of the following:

- Former Yirol South County:
  - Awerial Centre; headquarters: Awerial
  - Awerial East; headquarters: Abuyung
  - Awerial North; headquarters: Buna-gok
  - Awerial South; headquarters: Guol-yar (Mingkaman)
- Former Yirol East County:
  - Adior; headquarters: Adior
  - Lou; headquarters: Nyang
  - Malek; headquarters: Malek
  - Yali; headquarters: Yali
- Former Yirol West County:
  - Abang; headquarters: Abang
  - Aluakluak; headquarters: Aluakluak
  - Anuol; headquarters: Anuol
  - Geer; headquarters: Geer
  - Madbar; headquarters: Madbar
  - Ngop; headquarters: Ngop
  - Yirol Centre; headquarters: Yirol Centre

The counties are further sub-divided into payams, and the payams are then further sub-divided into bomas.

== List of governors of Eastern Lakes State ==
The governors of Eastern Lakes State in the order of first to last are the following:

1. Rin Tueny Mabor
2. Bor Wutcok Bor
3. Mangar Buong Aluenge
