= South Sudan Supreme Airlines =

South Sudanese airline

- "The Spirit of a Young Nation"

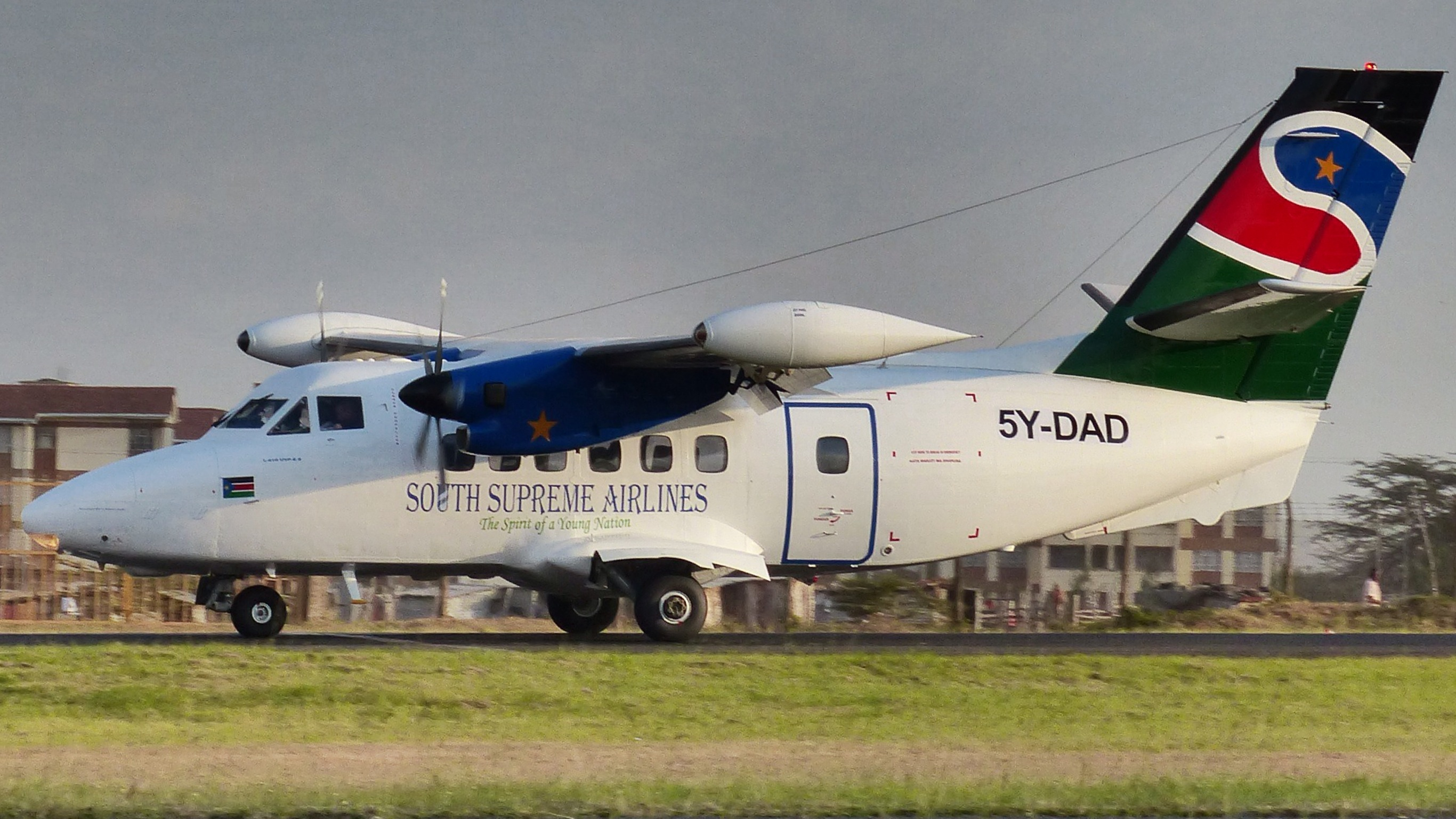
- A former South Supreme Airlines Let L-410 Turbolet at Wilson Airport in 2014
- Founded: 2013, 2017 (Renamed as South Sudan Supreme Airlines)
- Ceased operations: 2015 (As South Supreme Airlines) 2021 (TurboJet L-410 crash)
- Hubs: Juba Airport
- Fleet size: 1
- Destinations: 2
- Key people: Ayii Duang Ayii
- Website: http://flysouthsupreme.com (defunct)

South Sudan Supreme Airlines was a South Sudanese airline that began operations in September 2013. The airline was formed using the fleet of Feeder Airlines, which operated two Fokker 50A's. As of May 2014 the airline had regularly scheduled flights three times a week between Juba and Entebbe.

== Destinations ==
As of September 2022 the airline had two scheduled destinations:

Country	City	Airport	Refs
South Sudan	Juba	Juba International Airport	
South Sudan	Wau	Wau Airport	
Uganda	Entebbe	Entebbe Airport	

== Fleet ==
As of March 2017 the South Supreme Airlines fleet consisted of the following aircraft:

Aircraft	In Fleet
Bombardier CRJ100	1
Total	1

== Accidents and incidents ==
- On 20 March 2017, South Supreme Airlines Antonov An-26 aircraft was destroyed by fire after crashing at South Sudan’s Wau airport.
- A Let-410 of the revived airline crashed on March 2, 2021, after take-off from Pieri Airstrip in Juba, killing ten people and causing South Sudanese President Salva Kiir to order the suspension of the airlines' operational permits.
