= Majok =

Majok is a Dinka given name and surname. Notable people with the surname include:

- Abraham Majok (born 1998), Australian soccer player
- Ater Majok (born 1987), Australian basketball player
- Ayom Majok (born 2003), Australian footballer
- Madang Majok, Sudanese politician
- Martyna Majok (born 1985), Polish-American playwright
- Philemon Majok (1905–1982), Sudanese politician

People with the given name include:

- Majok Deng (born 1993), Australian basketball player
- Majok Majok (born 1992), Sudanese basketball player
