= 2020 South West Aviation Antonov An-26 crash =

2020 aviation accident in South Sudan

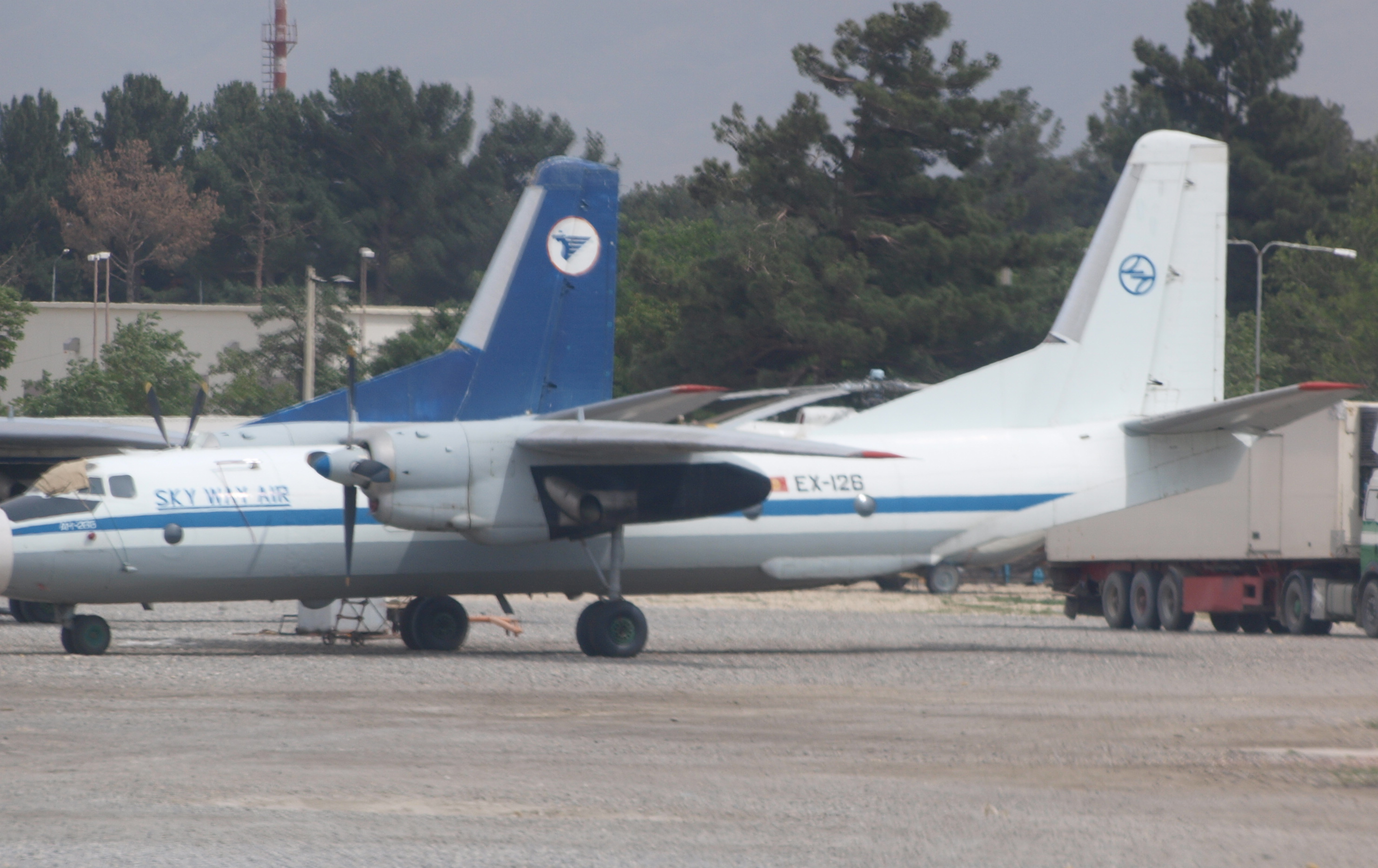
- EX-126, the aircraft involved in the accident, while still in service with Sky Way Air in 2009

Accident
- Date: 22 August 2020
- Summary: Crashed after takeoff for undertermined reasons
- Site: Juba Airport, Juba, South Sudan; 4°54′17.46″N 31°33′6.52″E

Aircraft
- Aircraft type: Antonov An-26B
- Operator: South West Aviation
- Registration: EX-126
- Flight origin: Juba Airport, Juba, South Sudan
- Stopover: Wau Airport, Wau, South Sudan
- Destination: Aweil Airport, Aweil, South Sudan
- Occupants: 9
- Fatalities: 8
- Injuries: 1
- Survivors: 1

On 22 August 2020, a South West Aviation An-26 turboprop aircraft crashed upon taking off from Juba Airport in Juba, South Sudan, for a domestic cargo charter flight to Aweil and to Wau, South Sudan.

== Background ==
South West Aviation Co. Ltd. founded in 2017, is a passenger and cargo airline based in Juba, South Sudan. The airline was responsible for the fatal crash of an L-410 Turbolet in Juba in 2018. In the aftermath of that accident, President Salva Kiir banned aircraft greater than 20 years of age from operating passenger flights.

== Accident ==
The Antonov An-26 freighter registration EX-126 (MSN 11508) performing a charter flight from Juba to Wau with six passengers and three crew lost height shortly after departure from Juba and impacted a farm about 2.5 nmi (4.6 km) from the runway. Eyewitnesses report that the aircraft suddenly lost power and crashed in the Hai Referendum residential area. Weather is not believed to be a factor. Eight people in the aircraft (three South Sudanese and five Russians) were killed. There was one reported survivor who was taken to a hospital in critical condition. According to South Sudanese Transport Minister Madut Biar Yol there were five crew members, all Russian nationals.

According to early reports, the plane crashed into a residential area. It burned as residents approached it.

Some reports indicated the aircraft was on a charter flight for the World Food Programme (WFP) when it crashed, but the WFP denied having any connection to the flight, saying that the aircraft had been chartered by Galaxy Star International, a local company that provides services to the WFP and other UN agencies.

== Investigation ==
South Sudan's Aircraft Accident Incident Investigation Department (AAIID) was unable to establish the cause of the crash, but determined that the flight violated regulations, as the plane lacked a valid airworthiness certificate and South West Aviation did not hold an air operator's certificate.

== Reactions ==
South Sudanese president Salva Kiir called upon the Ministry of Transportation to "adhere to international standards" when assessing the airworthiness of aircraft adding "I know that it is hard to cope with the tragedy of this nature, but let us work hard to find the cause of this accident and use the lessons learned from it to prevent the occurrence of similar tragedies in the future".

== See also ==
- 2015 Juba An-12 crash
- 2019 Busy Bee Congo crash
- 2020 Chuhuiv An-26 crash

=== Other crashes in residential areas ===
- El Al Flight 1862
- Pakistan International Airlines Flight 8303
