= Air Asia (disambiguation) =

Air Asia or AirAsia may refer to:

- AirAsia, a Malaysian low-cost airline
  - AirAsia China
  - AirAsia X
  - AirAsia India
  - Indonesia AirAsia
  - Indonesia AirAsia X
  - Philippines AirAsia
  - AirAsia Vietnam
  - AirAsia Zest
  - Thai AirAsia
  - Thai AirAsia X
  - AirAsia Japan
- Air Asia (Taiwan), a Taiwanese aircraft service company

== See also ==
- Asiana Airlines, a South Korean full-service airline
- Asia Airways, a Tajik airline
- Indonesia AirAsia Flight 8501
- Petaling Jaya Rangers F.C., a Malaysian football club, formerly known as AirAsia F.C.
