= Yirol East County =

County in Lakes State, South Sudan

Yirol East County is a county in Lakes State, South Sudan. The county borders Panyijar County in the North, Rumbek East County in the North west, Yirol West County in the west, Awerial County in the south, Bor County in the south east and Twic East County in the east. Shambe National Park as well as Ramciel are located in Yirol East County.

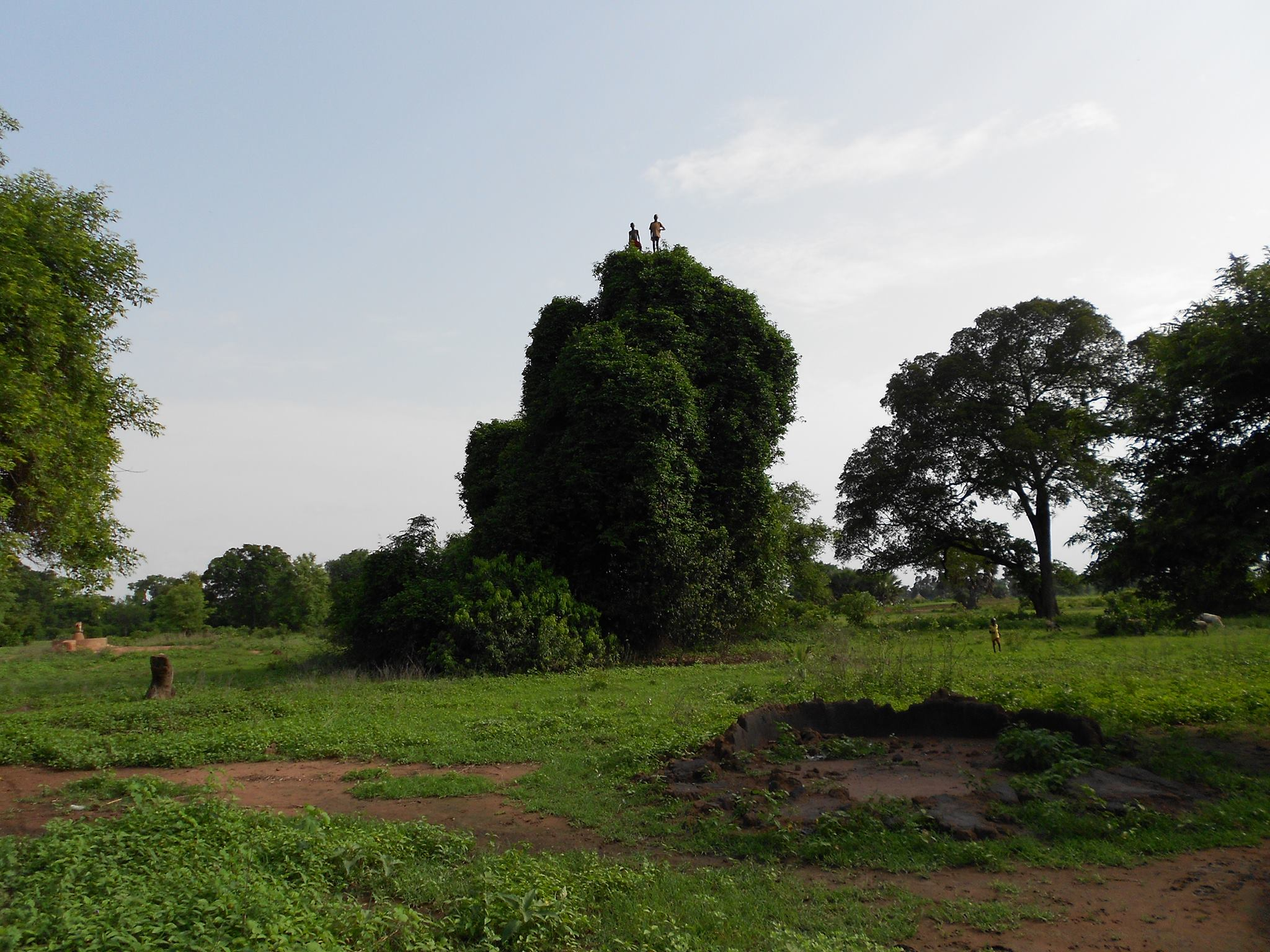
Children climbing a mahogany tree in Adior Payam.

== Administrative divisions ==
In 2016, Yirol East County was reorganized into four counties, which included the following:

1. Adior (Yirol East) County; headquarters: Adior
2. Lou County; headquarters: Nyang
3. Ramciel County; headquarters: Malek
4. Yirol North County; headquarters: Yali

== List of commissioners of Yirol East County ==
Yirol East County was carved out from Yirol County (Yirol West county) in 2005 just after signing of Comprehensive peace agreement. The list of commissioners is as follows:

Yirol county commissioners
Name	Time in office
Majok Machar Buoi	200 -2006
Athian Majak Malou	2006-2008
Santo Mading Domic	2008-2010
Bullen Bol Achinbai	2010-2012
Manyang Luk Lueth	2012-2015
Various commissioners	2015-2020
Johnson Malual Achiek	2020- 2022
Manyang Luk Lueth	2022- 2026
Mayor Aleth Nyimur	2026- incumbent

== Payams ==
Yirol East County is composed of seven Payams:

- Billing
- Adior
- Tinagau
- Malek
- Yali
- Lek-ha-kudu
- Pagarau

It also includes Nyang Town, the headquarters. The newly established Billing Payam is bordering Panyijar County in Unity.

== Adior Payam ==
Adior Payam (Palual Juet) is one of the Seven Payams of Yirol East county located 28 kilometers from East of Nyang town, the headquarters of Yirol East county. It borders Panyijar County of unity state to the north, Duk and Twic East counties of Jonglei State to the northeast and east respectively, Malek Payam to the south, Nyang Town and Tinagau Payam to the west.

Inhabitants of Adior Payam

The inhabitants of Adior Payam were Ajhäk a subgroup of the Dinka people but recent advocacy for recognition of Göng-Chiekic as an independent section from Ajhäk by the intellectuals of Biang, and Palëu has redefined the inhabitants of Adior Payam as Ajhäk and Göng-Chiekic. Göng-Chiekic is further divided into Ajong, Biang and Palëu, and the subdivision of Ajhäk are now Ajut,Angöör, Dhïïm and Luok. in 1980s Ajut, Angöör and Luok unified themselves under one name as Pirchik and still considered Pirchik as subsection of Ajhäk, while Dhïïm remained as Dhïïm Matung-nguan.

Bomas of Adior Payam

The Bomas of Adior Payam are Ayiem, Billing, Machar Achiek, And Shambe. Shambe National Park and Lake Shambe (Mabör Anyoop) are also located in Adior Payam. The population of Adior was 14,780 people, according to the 2008 population Census.

== Chiefdoms in Yirol East County ==
In 1946, British created a paramount chief, this creation brought the first two chiefdoms under one chiefdom named Ador and their leader was Anyieth Reec Amuou, but later separated in 1976-1977, Ador under Reech Ater later lost to Manyang Jok in local elections and Gok under Dhieu Anyieth later succeeded by his brother Reech Anyieth in 1977.

Yirol East County had four chiefdoms:

1. Ador and Gok chiefdom, their leader (benydit) was Ater Bar.
2. Gok chiefdom under Reech Amou.
3. Kuac chiefdom under Chep Aciek.
4. Ajak chiefdom under Takpiny Malual.

== Insecurity in Yirol East County. ==
Local authorities in areas such as Billing, Adior and Pagarau have been reporting cases of numerous attacks by suspected armed cattle thieves from Panyijar County of Unity State which border the county in the North. Organized armed forces also have conducted attacks in Yirol from the Unity State.

== Climate ==
The district's yearly temperature is 32.05 °C (89.69 °F) and it is 2.55% higher than South Sudan's averages. Yirol typically receives about 97.39 millimeters (3.83 inches) of precipitation and has 128.95 rainy days (35.33% of the time) annually.
