= Rin Tueny Mabor =

South Sudanese military officer and politician

Lt. Gen. Rin Tueny Mabor Deng is a South Sudanese military officer and politician who served as the Governor of Lakes State. He was appointed to the position in 2021 by President Salva Kiir and later replaced by Madang Majok.

Rin Tueny has also been the Governor of Eastern Lakes State, South Sudan since 24 December 2015. He is the first governor of the state, which was created by President Salva Kiir on 2 October 2015 which was later resolved by mutual agreement between President Kiir and Riek Machar. On 19 January 2026 Kiir issued an Presidential decree in which Rin Tueny was replaced by Madhang Majok as the state Governor.
