= Teker Riek Dong =

South Sudanese politician

Teker Riek Dong has been the Governor of Southern Liech, South Sudan since 24 December 2015. He is the first governor of the state, which was created by President Salva Kiir on 2 October 2015.
