= South West Aviation (South Sudan) =

Passenger and cargo airline based in Juba, South Sudan

- Founded: 2017
- Website: southwestaviationltd.com

South West Aviation Co. Ltd. was a passenger and cargo airline based in Juba, South Sudan. As of January 2026, the airline is listed as "Restarting".

== Incidents and accidents ==
- On 9 September 2018, a Let L-410UVP crashed into Lake Yirol on the way to Yirol Airport. Of the 23 people onboard, only three survived.
- On 22 August 2020, an Antonov An-26 operating a cargo flight from Juba to Aweil, South Sudan, crashed upon take-off, killing seven.
