= Feeder Airlines =

South Sudanese airline

- "The Pride of South Sudan"
| IATA | ICAO | Call sign |
|---|---|---|
| – | FDD | – |
- Founded: 2007
- Ceased operations: 2013
- Hubs: Juba Airport
- Fleet size: 2
- Destinations: 6
- Headquarters: Juba, South Sudan
- Key people: Nichola Ali Khamis; Managing Director
- Website: Archive of original website

Feeder Airlines was an airline based in Juba, South Sudan. It started operations on 2 June 2007 operating scheduled and charter services from Juba International Airport. The airline offered international flights to countries neighboring South Sudan, including Sudan and Uganda. After one of the aircraft operated by Feeder Airlines was written off after a runway excursion, the other aircraft used in Feeder Airlines was used to rename and make the brand new separate airline of South Supreme Airlines. One aircraft previously operated by Feeder Airlines is currently stored and another is not in use after damaging the aircraft in a 2012 accident. The company slogan was The Pride of South Sudan.

== Destinations ==
Feeder Airlines used to serve international flights within three African countries (South Sudan, Sudan, and Uganda). In South Sudan, the company served the cities of Juba (landing at Juba International Airport, the airline hub), Malakal (landing at Malakal Airport), Rumbek (landing at Rumbek Airport), and Wau (landing at Wau Airport). Outside of South Sudan, the airline served the cities of Khartoum, Sudan (landing at Khartoum International Airport) and Entebbe, Uganda (landing at Entebbe International Airport).

== Accidents and incidents ==
As of when the airline was no longer operational, Feeder Airlines has been involved in only one accident, which involved a runway excursion on 29 March 2012 at Wau Airport. No fatalities were reported, although five people received injuries (one flight attendant broke her leg during the evacuation process, and 4 other people received minor injuries). Although the airline hasn't been involved in any other accident, an accident involving the recently created South Supreme Airlines involved the other Fokker 50 (registration ST-NEW) which was previously operated by Feeder Airlines.

== See also ==
- Feederliner
- FedEx Feeder
