= 2025 Light Air Services Beechcraft 1900 crash =

2025 aviation accident in South Sudan

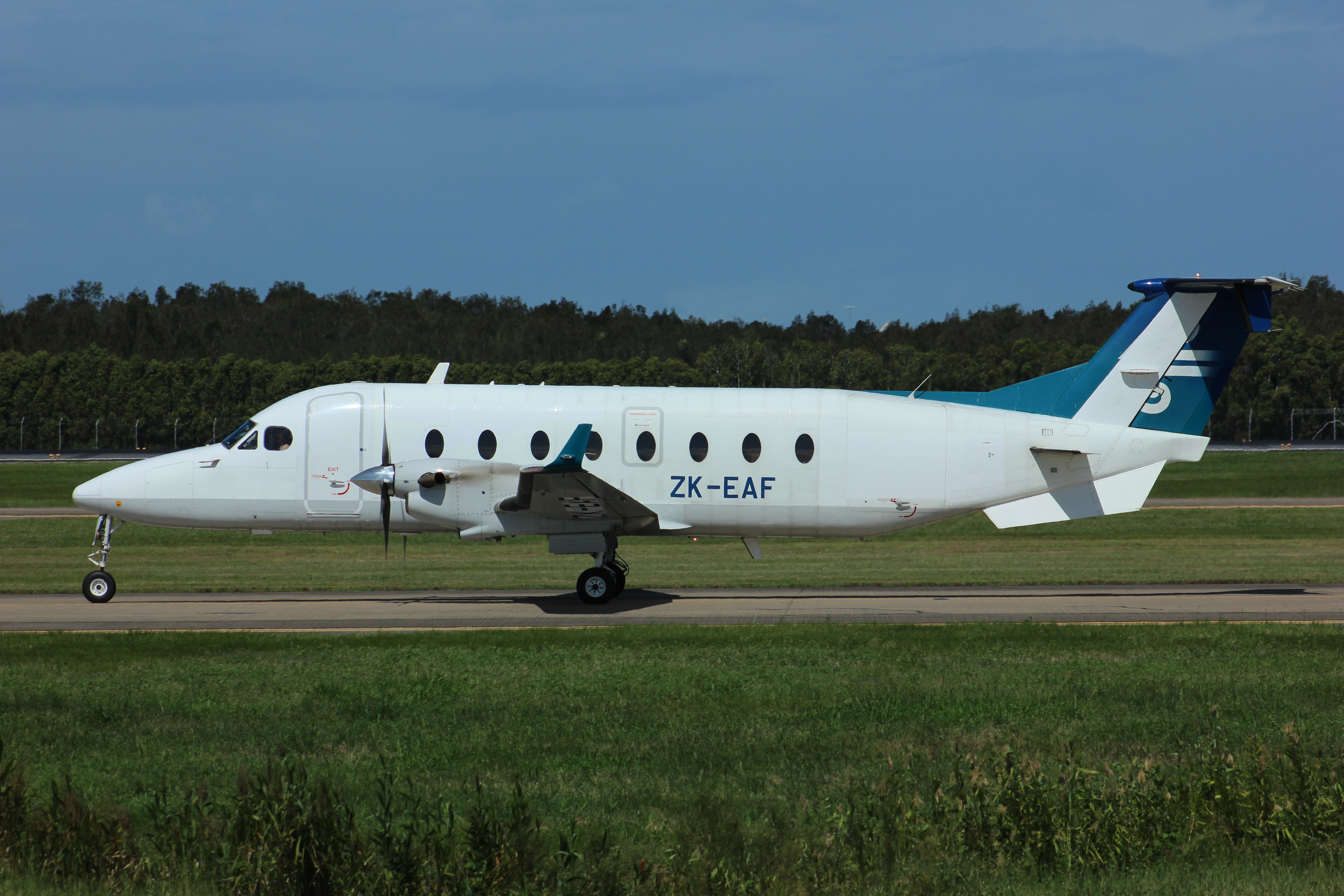
- The aircraft involved in the accident, while still in storage with Eagle Airways in 2016

Accident
- Date: 29 January 2025
- Summary: Crashed shortly after takeoff, under investigation
- Site: Near GPOC Unity Airstrip, Rubkona County, Unity State, South Sudan; 9°28′00″N 29°40′22″E

Aircraft
- Aircraft type: Beechcraft 1900D
- Operator: Eagle Air on behalf of Light Air Services
- Registration: 5X-RHB
- Flight origin: GPOC Unity Airstrip, Rubkona County, Unity State, South Sudan
- Destination: Juba International Airport, Juba, South Sudan
- Occupants: 21
- Passengers: 19
- Crew: 2
- Fatalities: 20
- Injuries: 1
- Survivors: 1

On 29 January 2025, a Beechcraft 1900 operated by Eagle Air on behalf of Light Air Services crashed in Unity State, located in the Greater Upper Nile region of South Sudan. The aircraft was on a routine scheduled charter flight from GPOC Unity Airstrip to Juba International Airport when it crashed shortly after takeoff, killing 20 out of 21 on board. The aircraft was transporting oil workers to the South Sudanese capital Juba.

== Background ==
=== Aircraft ===
The aircraft involved was a 23-year-old twin engined turboprop Beechcraft 1900D. Ugandan airline Eagle Air purchased the aircraft in 2016, bearing the registration 5X-RHB. The aircraft was stored until it was leased to Light Air Services in 2017.

=== Passengers and crew ===
There were 21 people aboard the aircraft: 19 passengers and 2 pilots. Sixteen of the passengers were South Sudanese, while one Indian, two Chinese nationals and two Ugandan crew were also on board. The aircraft was operated by Light Air Services aviation company and was chartered by the passengers' employer, the Chinese petroleum firm Greater Pioneer Oil Company (GPOC), which is a consortium of China National Petroleum Corporation and Nile Petroleum Corporation.

== Accident ==
The aircraft was performing a regularly scheduled charter flight. At around 10:30 am local time, approximately 10 minutes after takeoff, the aircraft lost height and crashed into the ground. A witness reported that a wing had snapped off, resulting in the aircraft losing altitude. Pictures shared on social media showed that debris was scattered across the site of the crash with the aircraft upside down. Twenty of the twenty-one people on board were killed, including two who later died in hospital. The sole survivor of the crash was a South Sudanese engineer who was taken to the state hospital in Bentiu in critical condition.

== Aftermath ==
Initial media reports had stated that there were 18 fatalities, but Unity State Minister of Information and Communication Gatwech Bipal told Reuters that two people who had initially survived the crash had died. The sole survivor was rescued and later received medical treatment in Juba. He was described as being in critical condition by Bipal.

According to Sudans Post, official records showed that 18 people were killed in the crash. Although the flight manifest listed 19 passengers and 2 crew, two passengers had missed the flight and could not board the aircraft. Sudans Post also stated that due to initial confusion about the injured and "the evolving nature of the response," the reports of 20 casualties continued to be cited.

According to Radio Tamazuj, the names of the two passengers that had missed the flight were replaced with two others.

The bodies of the victims were airlifted to a morgue in Juba.

=== Response ===
South Sudanese President Salva Kiir expressed his condolences to the families of the victims, GPOC staff and all those who were affected by the crash. He also expressed "profound sorrow" over the death of the 20 people on board. The Ethiopian Ministry of Foreign Affairs expressed condolences in a press statement. Egypt expressed its condolences to South Sudan, and also expressed sympathy to the families and relatives of the victims.

Ter Manyang Gatwech, head of the Center for Peace and Advocacy (CPA), alleged that the accident was caused by the South Sudan Civil Aviation Authority's poor enforcement of safety standards, allowing aging and outdated aircraft to fly in South Sudan.

== Investigation ==
Saleh Akot, the director of Juba International Airport, said that the South Sudan Civil Aviation Authority deployed a team to the crash site to start the investigation. South Sudan Oil Minister Puot Kang Chol announced an investigation into the cause of crash, with his ministry cooperating with the Ministry of Transport, other local authorities and emergency services to ensure that a thorough examination is conducted. Preliminary findings on the cause of the crash were expected to be disclosed until later.

The National Minister of Transport said its air crash investigation department had retrieved the flight recorder from the wreckage of the crash and sent it to the United States for further analysis. On 7 March, New Zealand's Transport Accident Investigation Commission (TAIC) announced that it had opened an overseas assistance inquiry to support the Transport Safety Investigation Bureau of Singapore which was also assisting South Sudan in the investigation. The TAIC also stated that they were assisting in the recovery of records from Air New Zealand as the airline had owned the Beechcraft 1900D involved from 2002 to 2016.

== See also ==
- List of sole survivors of aviation accidents and incidents
