= Madang Majok =

South Sudanese politician

Maj. Gen. Madhang Majok is the current governor of Lakes State, South Sudan. He was the Governor of defunct Gok State from 24 December 2015 to the state's dissolution on 22 February 2020. He is the first governor of the state, which was created by President Salva Kiir on 2 October 2015. On 19 January 2026, Kiir issued a Presidential decree in which Lt. Gen. Rin Tueny was replaced by Madhang Majok as the Governor of the Lake State.
