= Abraham Makoi Bol =

South Sudanese politician

Lt. Col. Abraham Makoi Bol has been the governor of Western Lakes State in South Sudan since 24 December 2015. He is the first governor of the state, which was created by President Salva Kiir on 2 October 2015.

Bol is a South Sudanese veteran politician. He is from Nyang Agar Dinka subsection in Rumbek Central County. Rumbek was a headquarters of the Sudan People's Liberation Movement/Sudan People's Liberation Army before the signing of the Comprehensive Peace Agreement (CPA) in Naivasha in 2005. He was the first Rumbek Central County commissioner after the CPA. He held this post until the Sudan general election in 2010, in which he successfully stood for the state legislative assembly for the Rumbek town constituency. He was the MP until he was appointed governor of Western Lakes State.
