= Southern Liech State =

State of South Sudan from 2015 to 2020

Southern Liech
- State
- Location of Southern Liech in South Sudan
- Country: South Sudan
- Capital: Leer
- Number of Counties: 9

Population (2014 Estimate)
  - Total: 267,460

Southern Liech State was a state in South Sudan that existed between 2 October 2015 and 22 February 2020. It was located in the Greater Upper Nile region and it bordered Northern Liech to the north, Western Bieh to the east, Jonglei to the southeast, Eastern Lakes to the south, Western Lakes to the southwest, and Tonj to the west.

== History ==
On 2 October 2015, President Salva Kiir issued a decree establishing 28 states in place of the 10 constitutionally established states. The decree established the new states largely along ethnic lines. A number of opposition parties and civil society groups challenged the constitutionality of the decree. Kiir later resolved to take it to parliament for approval as a constitutional amendment. In November the South Sudanese parliament empowered President Kiir to create new states.

Teker Riek Dong was appointed Governor on 24 December.

== Administrative divisions ==
The state consisted of 9 counties:

- Rubkway County
- Mayiandit County
- Tharjiath-bour County
- Panyinjiar County
- Nyal County
- Ganyliel County
- Dhor-wang County
- Bou County
- Thornyor County
