= SPLM Youth League =

The SPLM Youth League (abbreviated SPLM-YL) is a youth organization in South Sudan, the youth wing of the ruling Sudan People's Liberation Movement. The SPLM-YL was confirmed as a functional body in 1990 in Kenya. The chairperson of the SPLM-YL was Akol Paul Kordit and as of 2017, Emmanuel Lubari Joseph become the second chairperson of SPLM-YL. following the current chairperson Cde Daniel Ali.
