= Awerial County =

Awerial Awerial County
- County
- Nickname: Aliab land
- Counties in Lakes State

- Location in South Sudan
- Coordinates: 6.1266°N 31.1738°E
- Country: South Sudan
- State: Lakes State

Area
  - Total: 4,544 km^{2} (1,754 sq mi)

Population (2017 estimate)
  - Total: 71,616
  - Density: 15.76/km^{2} (40.82/sq mi)
- Time zone: UTC+2 (CAT)
- Climate: Aw

Awerial is a County in Lakes State, central South Sudan.

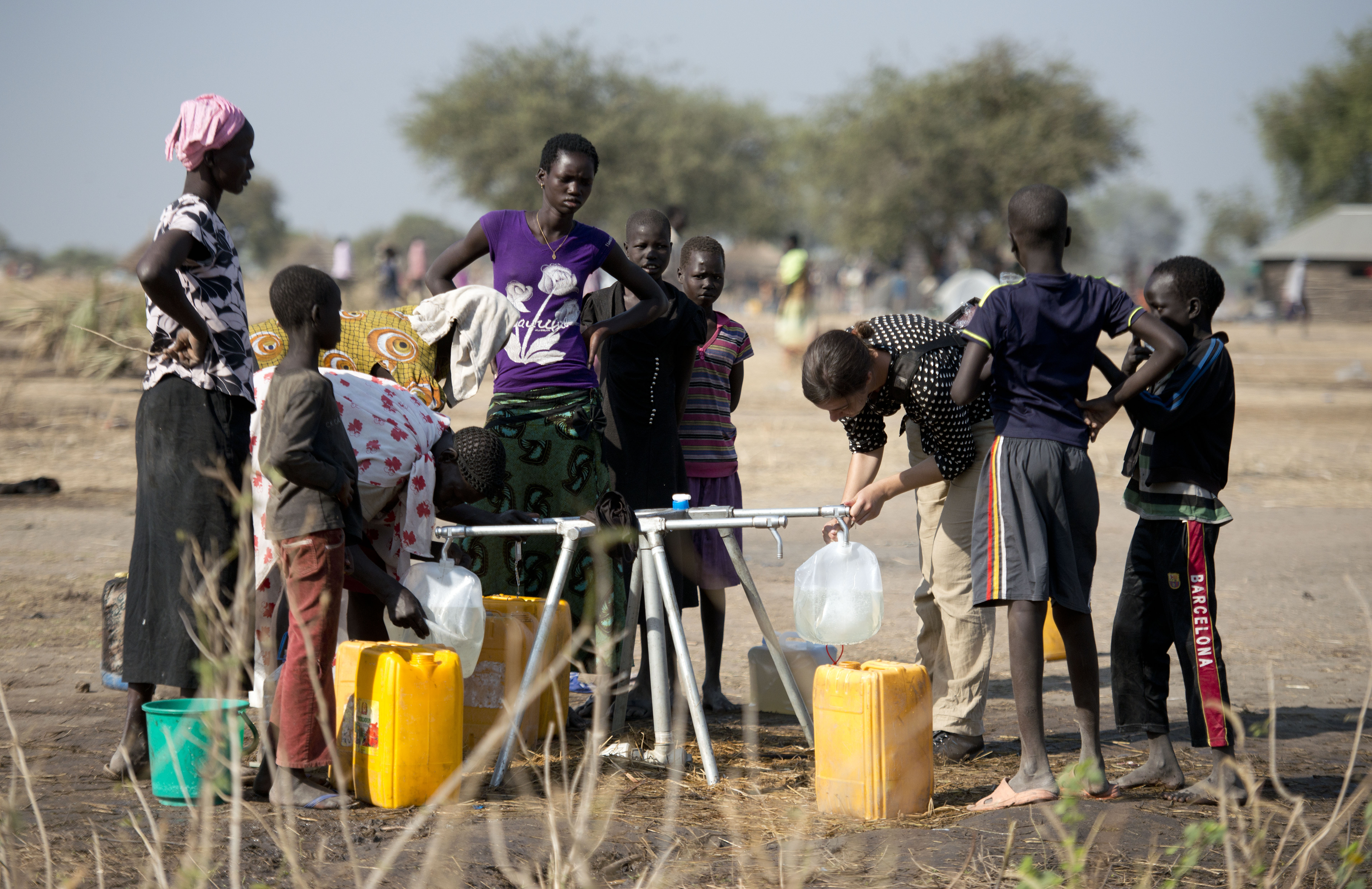
Awerial people

The County made headlines in December 2013 when it received over 70,000 internally displaced people fleeing fighting in nearby Bor . The town is also the seat of an Anglican Bishopric.

Awerial county is bordering Terekeka County of Central Equatoria State to the South, Bor County of Jonglei State to the East, Yirol East County to the North, Yirol West County to the North West.

== Climate of Awerial ==
The County made headlines in December 2013 when it received over 70,000 internally displaced people fleeing fighting in nearby Bor . The town is also the seat of an Anglican Bishopric.

Awerial county is bordering Terekeka county of Central Equatoria State to the South, Bor South County of Jonglei State to the East, Yirol East County to the North, Yirol West County to the North West.
