= Yirol =

- City
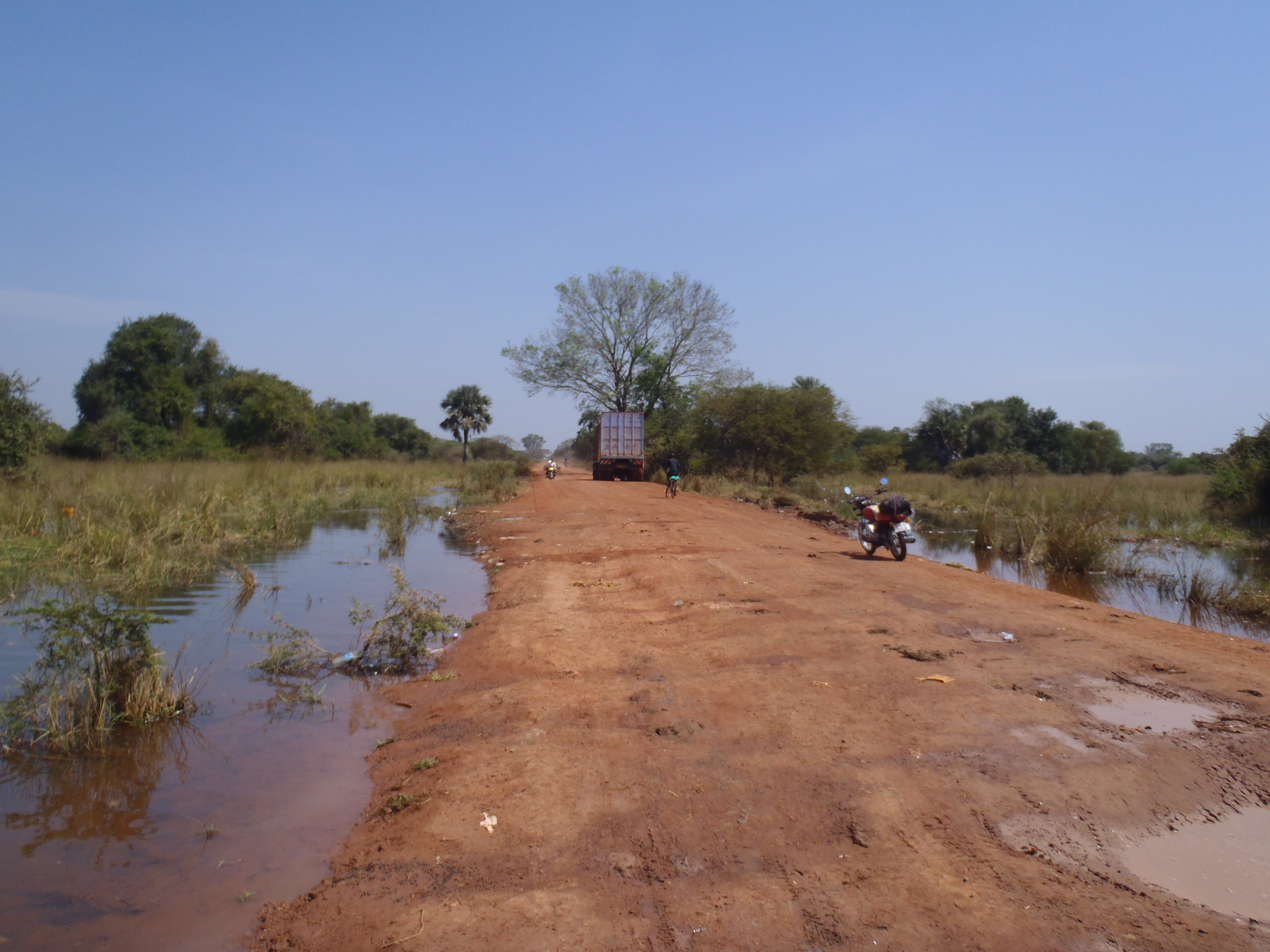
- Yirol Road, just outside Yirol Town, South Sudan

- Location in South Sudan
- Coordinates: 06°33′36″N 30°30′36″E
- Country: South Sudan
- Region: Bahr el Ghazal
- State: Lakes State
- County: Yirol West County

Population (2011 Estimate)
  - Total: 11,650
- Time zone: UTC+2 (EAT)
- Area code: +211
- Climate: Aw

Yirol is a city in South Sudan.

== Location ==
Yirol is the headquarters of Yirol West County, located in Lakes State, in central South Sudan. Its location lies approximately 313 kilometres (194 mi), by road, northwest of Juba, the capital and largest city of South Sudan. The coordinates of Yirol are: 6° 33' 36.00"N, 30° 30' 36.00"E (Latitude: 6.5600; Longitude: 30.5100).

== Overview ==
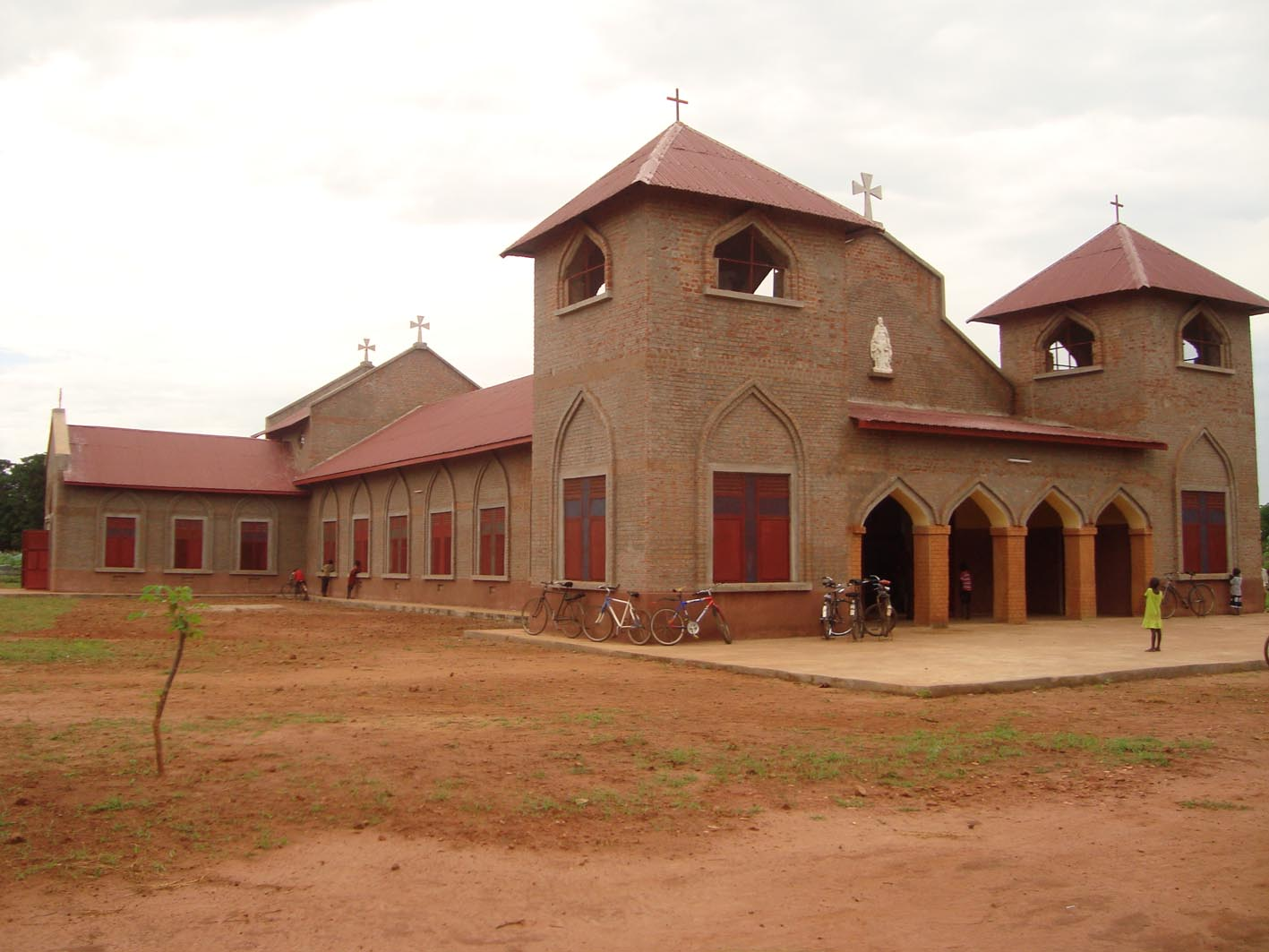
Yirol Church

Yirol is a small but growing town in the middle of South Sudan. It is surrounded by bodies of water (a river and a lake) which offer water for human and livestock use and consumption. The fish from the river and lake act as a source of protein for the local population.

Yirol is also the seat of an Anglican bishopric.

== Population ==
As of July 2011, it estimated that the population of Yirol, South Sudan is approximately 11,650.

== Economy ==
The three pillars of the economy in Yirol are (a) cattle ranching (b) fishing and (c) subsistence agriculture. Cattle ranching requires the frequent movement of animals in search of green pastures, in concert with the rain patterns in the area. Fishing takes place on nearby Lake Yirol, Lake Nyiboor, Lake Anyii and the River Payii.

== Transport ==
Three roads lead out of town:

- The road west leads to the town of Rumbek (est.pop: 2011 = 32,100), the capital of western State.
- The road north eventually leads to the town of Bentiu (est.pop: 2011 = 7,700), the capital of Unity State
- The road south eventually leads to the city of Juba (est.pop: 2008 = 250,000), the capital of South Sudan and the largest city in the country.

The town of Yirol is also served by Yirol Airport.

== See also ==
- Yirol Airport
- Lakes (state)
- Bahr el Ghazal
