= Rumbek North County =

- County
- Country: South Sudan
- State: Lakes State

Area
  - Total: 1,590 sq mi (4,110 km^{2})

Population (2017 estimate)
  - Total: 65,297
  - Density: 41.1/sq mi (15.9/km^{2})
- Time zone: UTC+2 (CAT)

Rumbek North County is an administrative area (county) located in Lakes State, South Sudan. In August 2016, portions of Rumbek North County were split in order to create Aloor County and Malueth County. On January 21, 2024, seven people were shot in the county after a bull triggered a fight. On February 21, 2025, two students were shot and killed in a swamp in the county.
