= Ramciel =

Proposed capital of South Sudan

- Location within South Sudan
- Coordinates: 6°23′48.57″N 30°56′4.18″E
- Country: South Sudan
- State: Lakes State
- County: Awerial County
- Abuyung Payam: Makur Boma
- Time zone: UTC+02:00 (CAT)

Ramciel is located in Awerial County, in Lakes States, in the Bahr el Ghazal region of South Sudan. It has been previously proposed to be the future national capital.

== Geography ==
Ramciel is about 250 kilometres (155 miles) north of Juba. There is currently no tarmacked road between Juba and Ramciel, but it is estimated that it will take under three hours to travel on a rough road to Juba. Under ideal conditions, it would also probably take about three hours to travel to Rumbek and up to six hours to Wau from Ramciel.

The largest grass swamp in the world, the Sudd, lies in the middle of Greater Bahr el Ghazal and Greater Upper Nile, thus making direct road communications between towns located at the opposite four corners of the Sudd practically impossible; thus the need to go around the swamp, which currently makes both Malakal and Bentiu inaccessible by road from the south and west in the wet season from June to November.

The inhabitants of Ramciel are mainly Aliab Dinka. Ramciel is located in the territory of Makur Boma of Abuyung Payam, Awerial county, Lakes State. The land is used for grazing and cultivation during the dry season and in the Nile marshes during the wet season. There are conflicting reports over its suitability for large-scale construction, with some characterizing the area as woodland & grassland, and others contending that the rocky highlands can support a major city if one were to be built there.

== National capital proposal ==
In early February 2011, what was then the Autonomous Government of Southern Sudan adopted a resolution to find a new capital for South Sudan. Ramciel was one of the two proposed locations for the site. Lakes Governor Chol Tong Mayay visited Ramciel later in the month to raise attention for its bid to be the site of the new capital. "The late Dr John Garang promised to build Ramciel as the capital of South Sudan and having it here will be a dream come true." Just prior to South Sudanese independence in July 2011, a government spokesman confirmed the federal government of the country was still considering building a new capital at Ramciel. On 2 September, the federal cabinet voted to designate Ramciel as the site for a planned city, to be demarcated from Lakes State.

Vice President Riek Machar said in mid-December 2011 that the government of South Sudan is planning to build a major international airport in a free trade zone to be established in Tali Payam of Terkeka County which borders Awerial (Aliab) County on the South West approximately 50 km away from Ramciel. Machar suggested that this airport could handle traffic from large cargo planes for which other regional airports are not designed, an asset that would be vital to realising Machar's vision for South Sudan to become a trade hub in the center of the African continent. Machar also visited Kenisa (Panhom) where port is intended to be constructed.

Building progress has lagged official estimates, and as of 2023 satellite imagery shows practically no building. However, there was progress reported on the planning process: a contract was awarded in 2012 to conduct a survey and feasibility study of the site. The proposed area has been visited multiple times by Vice President Riek Machar.
