= Business Aviation Center =

Ukrainian charter airline

BUSINESS AVIATION CENTRE
IATA	ICAO	Call sign
UQ	BCV	BUSINESS AVIATION
- Founded: 1996
- Ceased operations: 2013
- Focus cities: Uzhgorod
- Fleet size: 5
- Headquarters: Kyiv, Ukraine
- Website: www.bac.aero

Business Aviation Centre, Private Stock Company (Ukrainian: ПрАТ "Центр ділової авіації") was an airline based in Kyiv, Ukraine. It operated charter and air taxi services in Ukraine, Europe and Asia, focusing on the VIP sector. Its bases were at Boryspil Airport and Kyiv Zhuliany Airport.

== History ==
Business Aviation Centre airline had been working in the Ukrainian aviation market, arranging and performing charter flights since 1996. The company operated its own fleet and constantly used the aircraft of its Ukrainian and foreign partners. Business Aviation Centre was a full member of the European Business Aviation Association (NBAA) and since 2003 was an official dealer for Jeppesen GmbH in Ukraine. Additionally, the company provided handling and airport services for Ukrainian and foreign companies at various airports in the country.

In November 2012, the BAC announced renewal of its scheduled passenger service from Kyiv Zhuliany International Airport to Uzhhorod International Airport, which was then the sole scheduled flight to Uzhhorod.

The Business Aviation Center ceased operations in July 2013.

== Fleet ==
The Business Aviation Centre fleet consisted of the following aircraft (as of Dec 2012):

- 2 Let L-410 UVP-E VIP
- 2 Beechcraft Premier 1A (Model 390) VIP
- 1 Gulfstream G200
