= Cueibet County =

- County
- Counties in Lakes State

- Location in South Sudan
- Coordinates: 7.2465°N 29.2488°E
- Country: South Sudan
- State: Lakes State

Area
  - Total: 1,879 sq mi (4,866 km^{2})

Population (2017 estimate)
  - Total: 177,987
  - Density: 94.74/sq mi (36.58/km^{2})
- Time zone: UTC+2 (CAT)

Cueibet County is an administrative area in Lakes State, South Sudan.
