= Gok State =

State of South Sudan from 2015 to 2020

Gok Gok manyin Akur Gok Arol
- State
- Nickname: Gok Marik
- Motto: In God We Trust
- Location of Gok State within South Sudan
- Country: South Sudan
- Capital: Cueibet
- Number of Counties: 6

Government
  - Governor: Madang Majok

Population (2014 Estimate)
  - Total: 174,460

Gok was a state in South Sudan that existed between 2 October 2015 and 22 February 2020. It was located in the Bahr el Ghazal region, and was formerly part of the Lakes State. Gok State bordered Tonj to the west and Western Lakes to the east. The state had a population of 117,755 in 2008 and an estimated population of 174,460 in 2014.

== History ==
Before the creation of Gok State, the state was formerly part of Lakes State. On 2 October 2015, President Salva Kiir issued a decree establishing 28 states in place of the 10 constitutionally established states. The decree established the new states largely along ethnic lines. A number of opposition parties and civil society groups challenged the constitutionality of the decree. Kiir later resolved to take it to parliament for approval as a constitutional amendment. In November the South Sudanese parliament empowered President Kiir to create new states.

Madang Majok was appointed Governor on 24 December.

== Geography ==
Gok State was located in the Bahr el Ghazal region, and was one of the smallest states. Gok State bordered Tonj State to the west and Western Lakes State to the east.

=== Administrative divisions ===
Until 2020, Gok State consisted of nine counties. Back in 2015, Gok originally consisted only of a single county (Cueibet County) before creating those additional counties. But as of 12 January 2019, four more new counties were established, to bring a total number of fourteen . Those counties were the following:

- Cueibet (county seat: Cueibet)
- Abiriu (county seat: Abiriu)
- Duony (county seat: Duony)
- Waat (county seat: Pagor)
- Anyar Nguan (county seat: Tiaptiap)
- Malou-Pech (county seat: Malou)
- Citcok (County Seat Citcok)
- Ngap (county Seat Ngap)

=== Towns and cities ===
The capital of the state was the town of Cueibet. The town was located in Cueibet County.
