= Wau Airport =

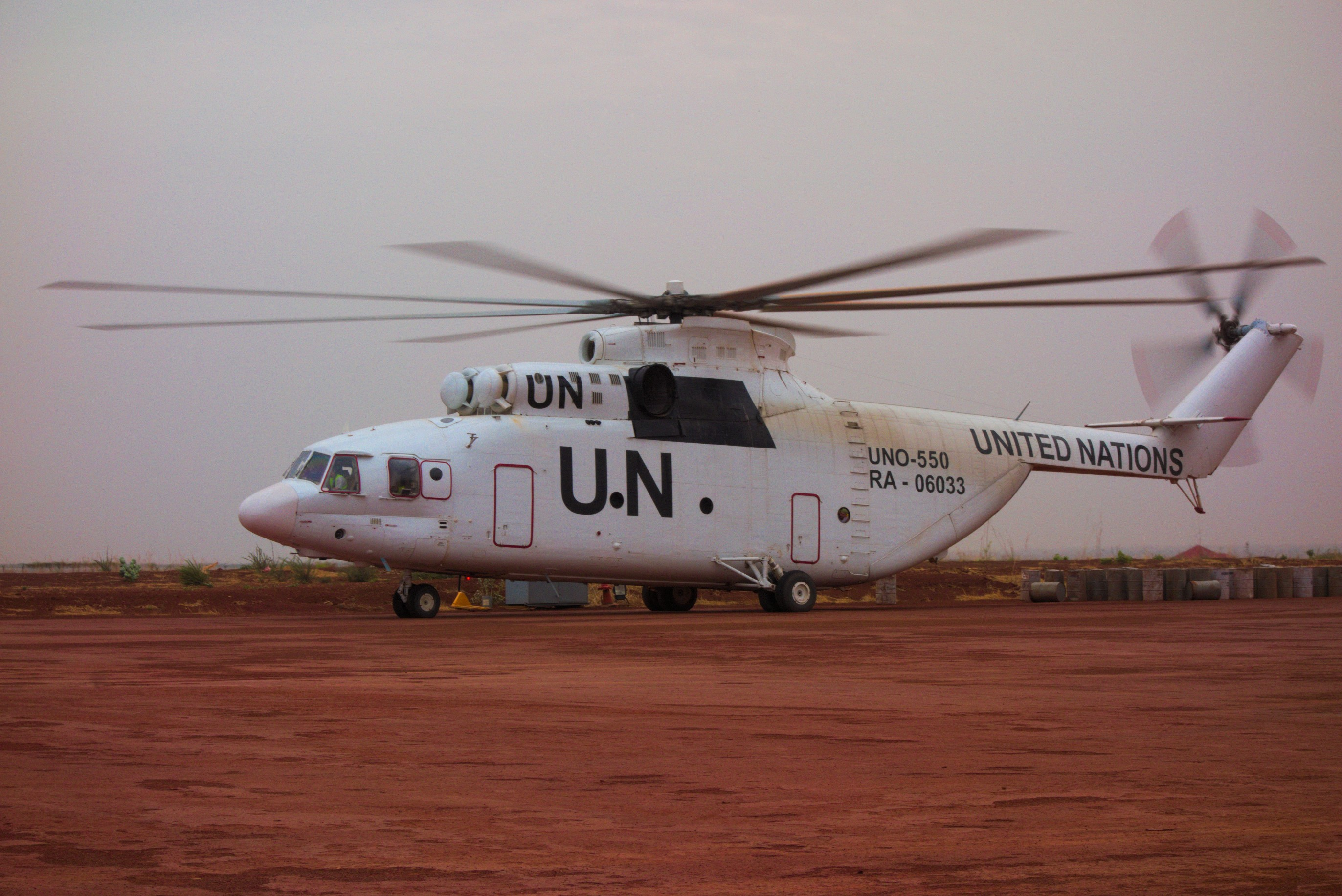
- IATA: WUU; ICAO: HSWW

Summary
- Airport type: Public
- Owner: Civil Aviation Authority of South Sudan
- Serves: Wau, South Sudan
- Location: Wau, South Sudan
- Elevation AMSL: 433 m (1,421 ft)
- Coordinates: 07°43′30″N 027°58′48″E

Map
- Location of airport in South Sudan

Runways
Direction	Length		Surface
Direction	m	ft	Surface
09/27	2,500	8,202	Asphalt

Wau Airport is a civilian airport that serves the city of Wau, South Sudan and surrounding communities. Feeder Airlines has three return flights a week between Khartoum-Wau-Juba. Southern Star Airlines used to provide service on Wednesdays and Sundays to Juba; however, this service has been suspended in 2011 when the airline ceased flying.

== Location ==
Wau Airport (IATA: WUU, ICAO: HSWW) is located in Wau County, Western Bahr el Ghazal, in the city of Wau. The airport is located to the northeast of the central business district of the city.

This location lies approximately 511 kilometres (318 mi), by air, northwest of Juba International Airport, the largest airport in South Sudan. The geographic coordinates of Wau Airport are: 7° 72' 58.12"N, 27° 97' 31.00"E (Latitude: 7.7250; Longitude: 27.9800). This airport sits at an elevation of 433 metres (1,421 ft) above sea level. In December 2012, a new paved runway measuring 2,500 metres (8,200 ft) in length was opened.

== Accidents and incidents ==
- 2017 South Supreme Airlines Antonov An-26 crash: occurred on 20 March 2017
- 2 September 1991 – Lockheed L-100-20 Hercules N521SJ of Southern Air Transport was taxiing at Wau and hit a landmine. The crew of five survived but the aircraft was a writeoff.
- 2 December 2025 – Samaritan's Purse Cessna 208 hijacking: a gunman demanding to be flown to Chad hijacked a Cessna Grand Caravan aircraft owned by Samaritan's Purse that was carrying out a humanitarian relief mission from Juba to Maiwut County. He was arrested after the pilot made a refueling stop at Wau Airport.

== See also ==
- Western Bahr el Ghazal
- Bahr el Ghazal
