= British Gulf International Airlines =

British Gulf International Company LTD.
IATA	ICAO	Call sign
-	BGI	BRITISH GULF
- Founded: 1996
- Hubs: Sharjah International Airport
- Fleet size: 5
- Headquarters: São Tomé, São Tomé and Príncipe
- Key people: Andrei Khamkov (General Manager)
- Website: http://www.britishgulf.com

British Gulf International Co. LTD was a cargo airline based in Sharjah, United Arab Emirates and operating from Sharjah and Dubai. Its main base is Sharjah International Airport, with a hub at Dubai International Airport.

== History ==
The company was established and started operations in July 1996 in Sharjah, UAE.

British Gulf lost one of its Russian built AN-12 cargo planes on 13 November 2008 in Iraq.

As from November 2009, the company is included in the list of airlines banned within the European Union.

With the temporary 2009 ban on AN-12 operations within the UAE economic area made permanent one year later, the fate of British Gulf was in doubt. As of late 2012 the company's web presence is gone and some of the aircraft fleet are stored at Rivne in Ukraine.

== Fleet ==
The British Gulf International Co. LTD fleet includes the following aircraft:

- 5 Antonov An-12s
