= Asia Airways =

Airline based in Dushanbe, Tajikistan

Asia Airways Tajikistan
IATA	ICAO	Call sign
-	ASW	ASIAWAYS
- Founded: 2007
- Ceased operations: 2015
- Hubs: Dushanbe Airport
- Fleet size: 6
- Destinations: PAX/Cargo
- Headquarters: Dushanbe, Tajikistan
- Key people: N. Khamraev

Asia Airways was a Tajik airline based in Dushanbe, Tajikistan. The airline provided cargo and passenger services between Tajikistan and countries such as Afghanistan, India, China, United Arab Emirates and Iran at September 2010. It ceased operations in 2015.

== Fleet ==
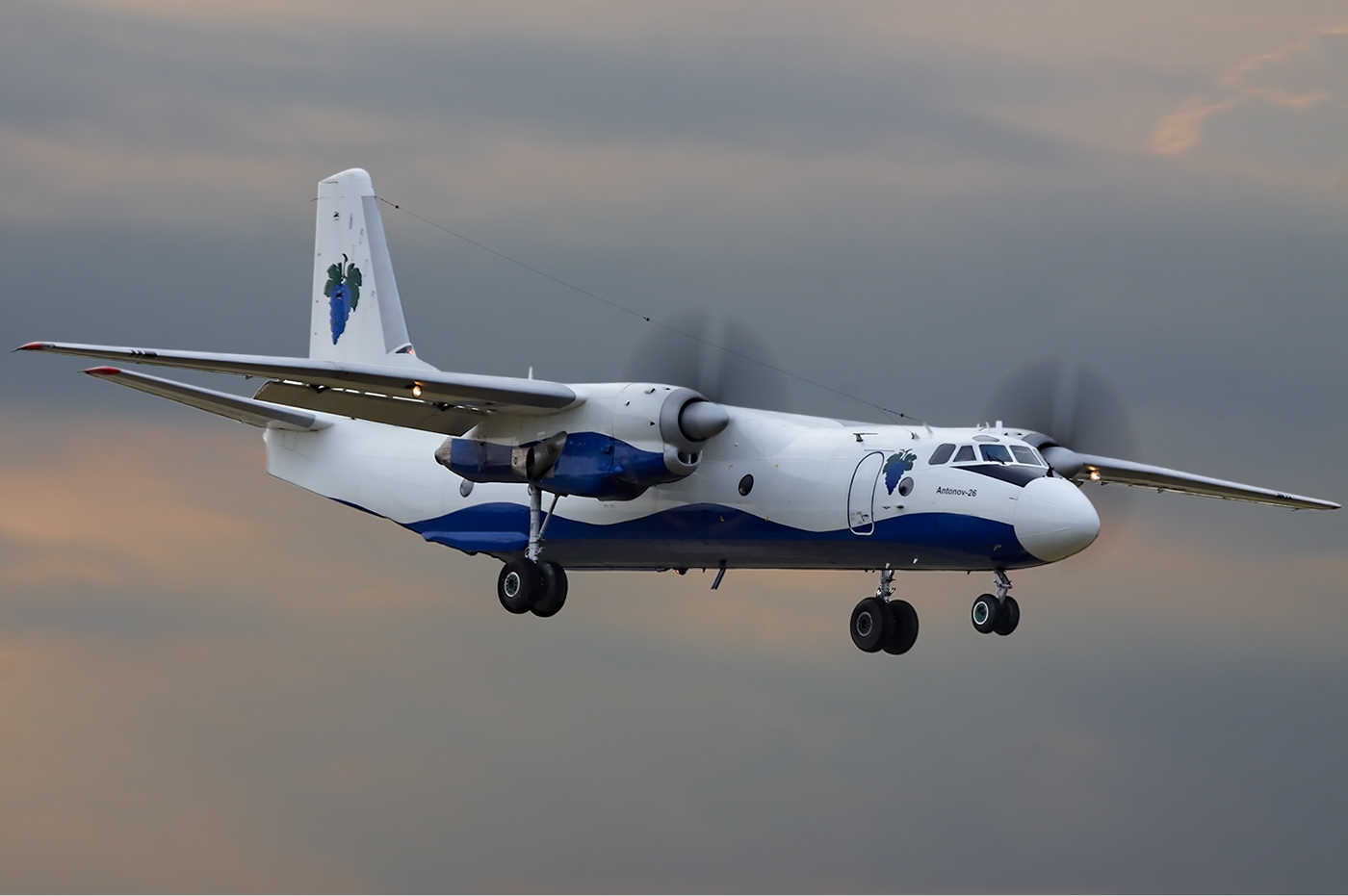
An Asia Airways Antonov An-26 (2012)

The Asia Airways fleet consisted of the following aircraft:

Type	In fleet	Notes
Antonov An-26	1	
Antonov An-12	3	
Fokker 50	1	
Ilyushin Il-76	1	

The airline fleet previously included the following aircraft (as of September 2014):

- 1 further Antonov An-12
