= Rumbek Centre County =

- County
- Country: South Sudan
- State: Lakes State

Area
  - Total: 1,490 sq mi (3,859 km^{2})

Population (2017 estimate)
  - Total: 232,752
  - Density: 156.2/sq mi (60.31/km^{2})
- Time zone: UTC+2 (CAT)

Rumbek Centre County is an administrative area (county) located in Lakes State, South Sudan. In August 2016, the former Rumbek Centre County had split to create Amongping County, Malek County and Rumbek County.
