= Yirol West County =

Yirol County
- County
- Counties in Lakes
- Country: South Sudan
- Region: Bahr el Ghazal
- State: Lakes State

Area
  - Total: 1,873 sq mi (4,851 km^{2})

Population (2017 estimate)
  - Total: 155,870
  - Density: 83.22/sq mi (32.13/km^{2})
- Time zone: UTC+2 (CAT)

Yirol West County is an administrative area in Lakes State, South Sudan. It is one the eight counties of Lakes State. Yirol West County borders Yirol East County to the east, Awerial County to the south, Terekeka county and Mvolo County to the Southwest and Rumbek East County to the west.

== Payams in Yirol West ==
There are nine payams in Yirol County.

1. Aluakluak
2. Geer
3. Paliet
4. Betoi
5. Panekar
6. Anuol
7. Genggeng
8. Benylom
9. Mapuordit

== Climate ==
The district's yearly temperature is 32.05°C (89.69°F) and it is 2.55% higher than South Sudan's averages. Yirol typically receives about 97.39 millimeters (3.83 inches) of precipitation and has 128.95 rainy days (35.33% of the time) annually.
