= Bahr el Ghazal (region of South Sudan) =

Coordinates: 8°00′N 28°00′E

Bahr el Ghazal بحر الغزال
- Region
- Flag

- Location of the region in South Sudan.
- Country: South Sudan
- Capital: Wau

Area
  - Total: 210,785.57 km^{2} (81,384.76 sq mi)

Population (2014 Estimate)
  - Total: 4,296,600
  - Density: 20.384/km^{2} (52.794/sq mi)
- Time zone: UTC+2 (CAT)

The Bahr el Ghazal (Arabic: بحر الغزال) is a region of northwestern South Sudan. Its name came from the river Bahr el Ghazal. The name translates as "sea of gazelles" from Arabic.

== Geography ==
Bahr el Ghazal borders the Central African Republic to the west. It is an area of swamps and ironstone plateaus inhabited mainly by the Dinka people, who make their living through subsistence farming and cattle herding plus Luwo and Fartit tribes.

=== Administrative divisions ===
Bahr el Ghazal consists of the following states:

- Lakes
- Northern Bahr el Ghazal
- Warrap
- Western Bahr el Ghazal
- Abyei Area

Between October 2015 and January 2020, the region consisted of the following states:

- Eastern Lakes State
- Gok State
- Western Lakes State
- Aweil East State
- Aweil State
- Tonj State
- Twic State
- Lol State
- Wau State
- Gogrial State
- Abyei Area

== History ==
It was historically subject to raids by the Fur invaders from the neighboring region of Darfur. The khedive of Egypt made Bahr al Ghazal his province in 1864. Powerful native merchants, who set themselves up as princes complete with armies, emerged in the area. The most powerful of them, al-Zubayr, fought and defeated a joint Turkish/Egyptian force sent to Bahr el Ghazal in 1873. The khedive conceded defeat and made Bahr el Ghazal a nominal province of Egypt, with al-Zubayr as its governor. It came under Mahdist control in 1884, when Karam Allāh Muḥammad Kurkusāwī was appointed governor.

The region was visited by the anthropologist E. E. Evans-Pritchard in 1929. The region was later incorporated into Anglo-Egyptian Sudan and became the ninth province after being split from Equatoria in 1948, and later a province, and then state, under the Republic of Sudan. In 1996, the region was divided into the four current districts as part of an administrative reorganization of the country. During the condominium period of joint British-Egyptian rule, the area was administered by British district officers; because of annual flooding and difficult traveling conditions, the area became part of what was known colloquially in the British Sudan Service as "The Bog", with British District Officers known as "Bog Barons"

The region has been affected by civil war for many years. It was a scene of fighting in the First Sudanese Civil War. In 1982, the Sudan People's Liberation Army (SPLA) was formed there by John Garang to fight the Northerners-dominated government in Khartoum. This was the beginning of what quickly became known as the Second Sudanese Civil War. The subsequent conflict lasted until 2003 and killed more than two million people. A substantial fraction of the population of the region is internally displaced or refugees in neighboring countries.

Under legislation approved by the government of South Sudan in 2011, Bahr el Ghazal could host a planned city at Ramciel intended to serve as the new national capital. If a new capital at Ramciel is built, it would mark a shift away from the power center in Equatoria, though Ramciel is located very close to the border between Lakes state and Central Equatoria.

== See also ==
- 1998 Sudan famine
