= Rumbek East County =

- County
- Country: South Sudan
- State: Lakes State

Area
  - Total: 1,380 sq mi (3,573 km^{2})

Population (2017 estimate)
  - Total: 186,412
  - Density: 135.1/sq mi (52.17/km^{2})
- Time zone: UTC+2 (CAT)

Rumbek East County is an administrative area (county) located in Lakes State, South Sudan. In August 2016, the former Rumbek East County had split to create Eastern Bhar Naam County and Western Bhar Naam County. Headquarter of Rumbek East is located at Thon-Aduel
