= Lakes State =

State of South Sudan

Lakes State Jieng/Belle
- State
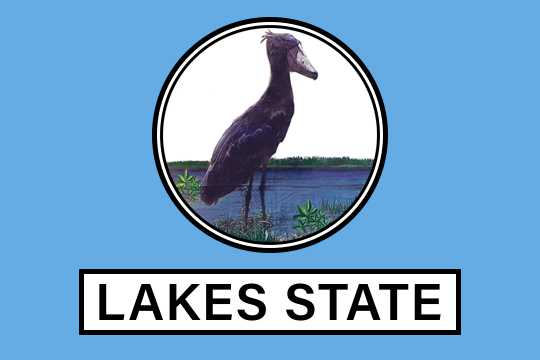
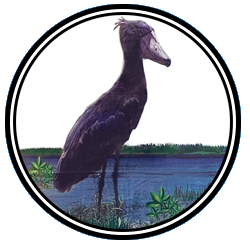
- Flag Seal

- Location in South Sudan.
- Coordinates: 06°46′N 28°53′E
- Country: South Sudan
- Region: Bahr el Ghazal
- State: Jul 9th 2011
- Capital: Rumbek

Government
  - Type: Caretaker Government
  - Caretaker Governor: Rin Tueny Mabor Deng

Area
  - Total: 43,595.08 km^{2} (16,832.15 sq mi)

Population (2017 estimate)
  - Total: 853,097
  - Density: 19.5687/km^{2} (50.6826/sq mi)
- Time zone: UTC+2 (CAT)
- HDI (2019): 0.348 low · 6th of 10

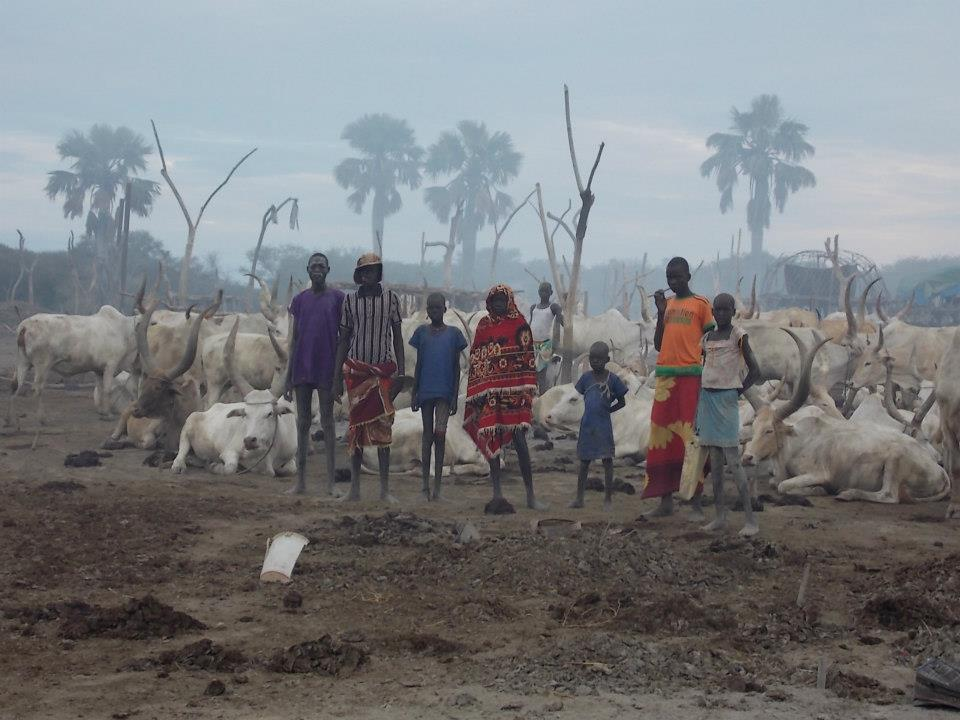
Cattle Herders at Cattle Camp in Rumbek

Lakes is a state in South Sudan. It has an area of 43,595.08 km^{2}. Rumbek is the capital of the state. Lakes is in the Bahr el Ghazal region of South Sudan, in addition to Northern Bahr el Ghazal, Western Bahr el Ghazal, and Warrap states. Bahr el Ghazal itself was a former province which was split from the Anglo-Egyptian mudiriyat, or province of Equatoria in 1948. The eastern border was the White Nile with Jonglei State on the opposite bank. To the northeast lay the Unity State. Other borders included Warrap State towards the northwest, Western Equatoria to the south and west, and Central Equatoria to the south.

In July 2011, Ramciel in Lakes state was under consideration by the federal government as a site for a new national capital, which would replace Juba.

== Administration ==
Like all states in South Sudan, Lakes was divided into counties; there were eight counties, each headed by a County Commissioner.

County	Area (km^{2})	Population Census 2008	County Commissioner
Awerial	4,659.10	47,041	Simon Jok (SPLM)
Cueibet	4,823.56	47,041	Akol Isaiah (SPLM-IO)
Rumbek North	4,531.13	43,410	Arop Kumbai
Rumbek Central	3,866.85	153,550	Dut Manaak (SSOA)
Wulu	11,700.60	40,550	Stephen Thiang Mangar
Rumbek East	3,588.10	122,832	Mangar Machuol Malok (SPLM)
Yirol West	5,024.84	103,190	Achieng Anhiem Bahon (SPlM-IO)
Yirol East	5,588	67,402	Manyang Luk (SPLM )

The counties are further divided into Payams, then Bomas.

== Disestablishment and re-establishment ==
Lakes State was disestablished in October 2015 due to South Sudan's president Salva Kiir issuing a decree establishing 28 states in place of the 10 previously established states. As a result, the states of Eastern Lakes, Gok and Western Lakes were created. Lakes state was re-established by a peace agreement signed on 22 February 2020.

== Conflict ==
Cattle raids were persistent in the Lakes State, between the Republic of Sudan and the former rebel group SPLA/M, since the CPA was signed in 2005. Human rights journalist Manyang Mayom reported heavily on government oppression in the Lakes State; his work won him the Human Rights Watch Award on August 4, 2010. Mayom was expelled from the Warrap State in November 2021 for his work in that region with the United Nations Mission in South Sudan (UNMISS).
