= Makuach, South Sudan =

Makuach Payam
- Payam (administrative division)
- Location within South Sudan
- Country: South Sudan
- Region: Greater Upper Nile
- State: Jonglei State
- County: Bor County

Makuach is a Payam in the Bor County of Jonglei State in the Greater Upper Nile region of South Sudan. It is situated on the east side of the Bahr al Jabal River. Bor town borders Makuach to the west, Baidit Payam to the north, and Anyidi Payam to the south.

== Demographics ==
Makuach is composed of four bomas: Kapat, Konbek, Makuach, Madiing Boma and Werkok. According to the Fifth Population and Housing Census of Sudan, conducted in April 2008, Makuach had a combined population of 29,412 people, composed of 15,251 male and 14,161 female residents. (Note: The data collected during the Fifth Population and Housing Census of Sudan were to be the primary source of information for decisions about the number and demarcation of electoral constituencies and administrative boundaries in what was then southern Sudan. South Sudanese officials rejected census results for southern Sudan. See Darfur Relief and Documentation Centre (2010). 5th Population and Housing Census in Sudan – An Incomplete Exercise (PDF) (Report). Darfur Relief and Documentation Centre, Geneva (Switzerland). Archived from the original (PDF) on September 18, 2017.. Also, see Demographics of South Sudan.)

Makuach is home to four major communities. These are Koch, Deer, Ater, Madiing and Adumuor.

== Landmarks ==
Zion
- Dhion
- Zion's location in South Sudan

Religion
- District: Makuach

Location
- State: Jonglei State
- Country: South Sudan
- Coordinates: 6°18′50.9″N 31°40′20.8″E

Architecture
- Groundbreaking: 1992
- Completed: 1996
- Materials: Wattle and daub, Thatch

A huge church called Dhion (Zion), which is often cited as the largest grass-roofed structure ever built in South Sudan, is located at Pakayo (or Pakeo), a site between the Werekok and Kapat boma centers. Construction of the church was begun in 1992 by participants in a popular Christian-conversion movement led by Paul Kon Adjith, who is buried in the church compound. Marc Nikkel visited the site in 1994 and described it like this:

I was astonished by the sight of Zion, more substantial than I had envisioned, with its numerous outbuildings and fenced compounds, all of mud and thatch. Certainly the church is the largest and most impressive building of local construction I have seen in Sudan, the labor of thousands of committed souls. Beautifully thatched, it rises to perhaps thirty feet at is center. Amid a forest of supporting poles, like a primitive cathedral, the congregation (numbering some four thousand on our visit) fills the arms of the cross, all facing toward a central octagonal dais. — Marc Nikkel, Why Haven't You Left? Letters from the Sudan, Church Publishing
