= Makuach (boma), South Sudan =

Makuach
- boma village
- Country: South Sudan
- Region: Greater Upper Nile
- State: Jonglei State
- County: Bor County
- Payam: Makuach

Makuach village is a boma in Makuach payam, in the Bor County of Jonglei State in the Greater Upper Nile region of South Sudan, about 15 kilometers east of Bor.

== Demographics ==
According to the Fifth Population and Housing Census of Sudan, conducted in April 2008, Makuach boma had a population of 5,555 people, composed of 2,721 male and 2,834 female residents. (Note: In 2008, at the time of the census, Makuach was located in Bor South County. The data collected during the Fifth Population and Housing Census of Sudan were to be the primary source of information for decisions about the number and demarcation of electoral constituencies and administrative boundaries in what was then southern Sudan. South Sudanese officials rejected census results for southern Sudan. See Darfur Relief and Documentation Centre (2010). 5th Population and Housing Census in Sudan – An Incomplete Exercise (PDF) (Report). Darfur Relief and Documentation Centre, Geneva (Switzerland). Archived from the original (PDF) on September 18, 2017. Also, see Demographics of South Sudan.)
