= Konbek, South Sudan =

Konbeek-Lualdit
- boma village
- Country: South Sudan
- Region: Greater Upper Nile
- State: Jonglei State
- County: Bor County
- Payam: Makuach

Konbeek-Lualdit is a boma in Makuach payam, in the Bor County of Jonglei State in the Greater Upper Nile region of South Sudan, about 15 kilometers east of Bor.

== Demographics ==
According to the Fifth Population and Housing Census of Sudan, conducted in April 2008, Konbeek-Lualdit boma had a population of 8,951 people, composed of 4,624 male and 4,327 female residents. (Note: In 2008, at the time of the census, Konbek was located in Bor South County. The data collected during the Fifth Population and Housing Census of Sudan were to be the primary source of information for decisions about the number and demarcation of electoral constituencies and administrative boundaries in what was then southern Sudan. South Sudanese officials rejected census results for southern Sudan. See Darfur Relief and Documentation Centre (2010). 5th Population and Housing Census in Sudan – An Incomplete Exercise (PDF) (Report). Darfur Relief and Documentation Centre, Geneva (Switzerland). Archived from the original (PDF) on September 18, 2017. Also, see Demographics of South Sudan.)

== Education ==
The Ayak Anguei Girls Primary Boarding School was located in Konbek until 2013, when it was first damaged by a tornado and then forced by armed conflict to close. The school was one of only two all-girls boarding school in the region, and one of the few in South Sudan. The school was built in 2008 and had an enrollment of 600 students in 2009.
