= Werkok, South Sudan =

Werkok
- boma village
- Location within South Sudan
- Coordinates: 6°20′15″N 31°29′23″E
- Country: South Sudan
- Region: Greater Upper Nile
- State: Jonglei State
- County: Bor County
- Payam: Makuach

Werkok is a boma in Makuach payam, in the Bor County of Jonglei State in the Greater Upper Nile region of South Sudan, about 13 kilometers north-east of Bor. From 2016 to 2020, it served as the county headquarters for Bor Central County.

== Demographics ==
According to the Fifth Population and Housing Census of Sudan, conducted in April 2008, Werkok boma had a population of 8,713 people, composed of 4,737 male and 3,976 female residents. (Note: In 2008, at the time of the census, Werkok was located in Bor South County. The data collected during the Fifth Population and Housing Census of Sudan were to be the primary source of information for decisions about the number and demarcation of electoral constituencies and administrative boundaries in what was then southern Sudan. South Sudanese officials rejected census results for southern Sudan. See Darfur Relief and Documentation Centre (2010). 5th Population and Housing Census in Sudan – An Incomplete Exercise (PDF) (Report). Darfur Relief and Documentation Centre, Geneva (Switzerland). Archived from the original (PDF) on September 18, 2017. Also, see Demographics of South Sudan.)

== Governance ==
On several occasions in 2006, 2008, and 2009, during his time as Governor of Jonglei, Kuol Manyang Juuk proposed relocating the Bor County Headquarters from Bor Town to Werkok as a security measure.
