= Battle of Bor =

Conflict during the South Sudanese Civil War

Coordinates: 6°12′45″N 31°33′39″E

- Part of the South Sudanese Civil War
| Date | 18 December 2013 – 18 January 2014 (1 month) |
| Location | Bor, Jonglei State, South Sudan |
| Result | South Sudanese government victory |

Belligerents
| South Sudan; Uganda | (South Sudan) SPLA defectors Nuer White Army |

Commanders and leaders
| Abraham Jongroor Deng † | Peter Gadet |

Units involved
| Sudan People's Liberation Army (SPLA): 8th Division loyalists; Uganda People's Defence Force | 8th Division rebels Tribal and youth militias |

Strength
| 2,000 | More than 2,000 defectors 25,000 irregulars |

Casualties and losses
- Around 2,700 killed 17,000 civilians displaced to the UN camp in Bor
- Location within South Sudan

The Battle of Bor was one of the first battles of the South Sudanese Civil War, consisting of a series of clashes for the city of Bor, the capital of Jonglei State, between the SPLA and SPLA defectors under Peter Gadet, part of the force that would become the SPLA-IO. The city changed hands four times between December 18, 2013 and January 18, 2014, ultimately leaving the SPLA in control.

== Background ==
On December 15, 2013, clashes broke out in the capital, Juba, as primarily Nuer units defected from the SPLA, the army of South Sudan. During the clashes, Dinka soldiers killed Nuer civilians in what some Nuer called a massacre. Tensions rose in Bor in Jonglei State, and three Dinka (all members of the Bor subgroup) were killed in incidents around the city on December 17.

Throughout the battle comparisons were made to the Bor massacre of 1991, during the Second Sudanese Civil War, in which Nuer forces under Riek Machar killed an estimated 2,000 Dinka.

== The Battle ==
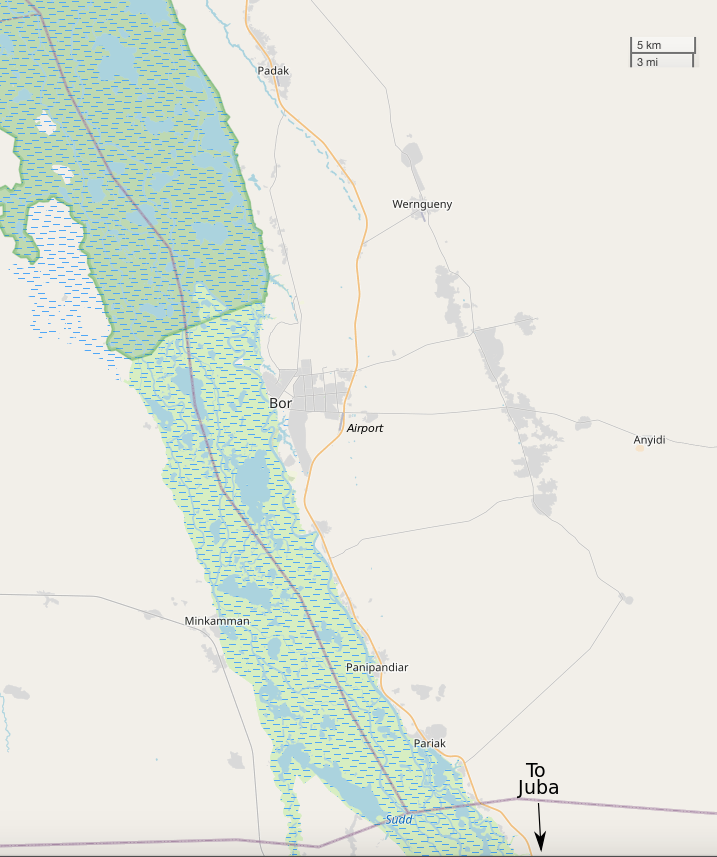
Bor and the surrounding towns in which the battle occurred

On December 18, 2013, at 02:30, around 2,000 soldiers under Peter Gadet, the commander of the 8th Division, a primarily Nuer unit, defected and launched a surprise attack with tanks, rockets, mortars, and artillery on the Panpandiar and Malual-Chaat military camps outside Bor, overrunning them by around 05:00. Fighting spread into the city, and a large part of the civilian population fled. By the evening of December 18, Gadet's troops were in control of the city center. On December 21, gunfire hit two US military airplanes attempting to evacuate American citizens from South Sudan, wounding four servicemen and forcing the planes to turn back. Also on December 21, there were reports of Ugandan jets bombing rebel positions. Around 15,000 civilians had fled to the UN base at Bor by December 22, leading to the UN reinforcing the base.

Elements of the 3rd Division were rushed to Juba as the SPLA prepared to take back Bor. On December 24, the SPLA declared victory after taking Panpandiar and Malual-Chaat and then most of the city as Gadet's troops made an orderly retreat, but fighting continued near the airport. There were no Christmas services in the city on December 25 as the fighting moved north of Bor to the town of Padak.

On December 27, Ugandan MiG-29 jets bombed rebel positions around Bor, and on December 30 Uganda confirmed it had sent troops into South Sudan.

By December 30 the youths of the Nuer White Army at joined the rebels in an attempt to retake Bor. On December 31, the rebels had control of most of Bor, with the SPLA controlling the airport. President Salva Kiir declared a state of emergency in Jonglei State on January 1, 2014, as the rebels moved south in the direction of Juba along the Bor-Juba road. The SPLA began releasing Equatorian garrisons to Juba, and Uganda also sent reinforcements. On January 4, while moving from Juba to the frontline in the town of Pariak, south of Bor, two groups of SPLA troops were ambushed, suffering heavy losses, including the death of Brigadier General Abraham Jongroor Deng. On January 5, SPLA forces took Pariak and pushed to the outskirts of Bor. However, the rebels launched an attack from the east on Pariak, now behind the front lines, but were repulsed.

On January 17, Gadet's forces, overwhelmed by airstrikes and not wanting an engagement with the Ugandans, withdrew from Bor. However, the SPLA and the Uganda People's Defence Force did not enter the city until January 18, believing that the rebels were still there.

== Aftermath ==
After of month of conflict, Bor was mostly destroyed from fighting and looting. Upon regaining the city, SPLA soldiers tried to force their way into the UN camp. The camp still contained thousands of people, leading to a measles outbreak about a week after the end of the fighting.
