= Kapat =

- boma village
- Location within South Sudan
- Coordinates: 6°16′08.5″N 31°41′26.7″E
- Country: South Sudan
- Region: Greater Upper Nile
- State: Jonglei State
- County: Bor County
- Payam: Makuach

Kapat (sometimes spelled Kapaat) is a boma in Makuach payam, in the Bor County of Jonglei State in the Greater Upper Nile region of South Sudan, about 10 kilometers east of Bor.

== Demographics ==
According to the Fifth Population and Housing Census of Sudan, conducted in April 2008, Kapat village had a population of 6,193 people, composed of 3,169 male and 3,024 female residents. (Note: In 2008, at the time of the census, Kapat was located in Bor South County. The data collected during the Fifth Population and Housing Census of Sudan were to be the primary source of information for decisions about the number and demarcation of electoral constituencies and administrative boundaries in what was then southern Sudan. South Sudanese officials rejected census results for southern Sudan. See Darfur Relief and Documentation Centre (2010). 5th Population and Housing Census in Sudan – An Incomplete Exercise (PDF) (Report). Darfur Relief and Documentation Centre, Geneva (Switzerland). Archived from the original (PDF) on September 18, 2017. Also, see Demographics of South Sudan.)
