= Akuai-deng =

- boma village
- Location within South Sudan
- Coordinates: 6°31′53.8″N 31°32′28″E
- Country: South Sudan
- State: Jonglei State
- County: Bor North County (since 2016)
- Payam: Jalle

Akuai-deng is a boma in Jalle payam, Bor North County, Jonglei State, South Sudan, about 45 kilometers northeast of Bor. The village borders Baidit Payam and is located at the southern extent of the sudd, South Sudan's central wetlands, near to the east bank of the Bahr al Jabal River.

== Demographics ==
According to the Fifth Population and Housing Census of Sudan, conducted in April 2008, Akuai-deng boma had a population of 5,248 people, composed of 2,694 male and 2,554 female residents. (Note: In 2008, at the time of the census, Akuai-deng was located in Bor South County. The data collected during the Fifth Population and Housing Census of Sudan were to be the primary source of information for decisions about the number and demarcation of electoral constituencies and administrative boundaries in what was then southern Sudan. South Sudanese officials rejected census results for southern Sudan. See Darfur Relief and Documentation Centre (2010). 5th Population and Housing Census in Sudan – An Incomplete Exercise (PDF) (Report). Darfur Relief and Documentation Centre, Geneva (Switzerland). Archived from the original (PDF) on 18 September 2017. Also, see Demographics of South Sudan.)
