= Cuei-keer =

- boma village
- Location within South Sudan
- Coordinates: 6°04′16″N 31°47′32.6″E
- Country: South Sudan
- State: Jonglei State
- County: Bor South County (since 2016)
- Payam: Kolnyang

Cuei-keer (often spelled Chuei keer) is a boma in Kolnyang payam, Bor South County, Jonglei State, South Sudan. It is located about 40 kilometers southeast of Bor, and serves as the county headquarters for Bor South County. Cuei-keer figures in a popular saying as the southernmost boma of Greater Bor, which runs "from Cuei-keer to Cuei-thon."

== Demographics ==
According to the Fifth Population and Housing Census of Sudan, conducted in April 2008, Cuei-keer boma had a population of 6,804 people, composed of 3,989 male and 2,815 female residents. (Note: The census table spells Cuei-keer with a "Ch" as Chuei-keer. In 2008, at the time of the census, Cuei-keer was located in Bor South County. The data collected during the Fifth Population and Housing Census of Sudan were to be the primary source of information for decisions about the number and demarcation of electoral constituencies and administrative boundaries in what was then southern Sudan. South Sudanese officials rejected census results for southern Sudan. See Darfur Relief and Documentation Centre (2010). 5th Population and Housing Census in Sudan – An Incomplete Exercise (PDF) (Report). Darfur Relief and Documentation Centre, Geneva (Switzerland). Archived from the original (PDF) on 18 September 2017. Also, see Demographics of South Sudan.)
