= Kuei-juet =

- boma village
- Location within South Sudan
- Coordinates: 6°42′42″N 31°25′20″E
- Country: South Sudan
- State: Jonglei State
- County: Bor North County (since 2016)
- Payam: Jalle

Kuei-juet is a boma in Jalle payam, Bor North County, Jonglei State, South Sudan, about 60 kilometers northeast of Bor.

== Demographics ==
According to the Fifth Population and Housing Census of Sudan, conducted in April 2008, Kuei-juet boma had a population of 1,919 people, composed of 1,005 male and 914 female residents. (Note: In 2008, at the time of the census, Kuei-juet was located in Bor South County. The data collected during the Fifth Population and Housing Census of Sudan were to be the primary source of information for decisions about the number and demarcation of electoral constituencies and administrative boundaries in what was then southern Sudan. South Sudanese officials rejected census results for southern Sudan. See Darfur Relief and Documentation Centre (2010). 5th Population and Housing Census in Sudan – An Incomplete Exercise (PDF) (Report). Darfur Relief and Documentation Centre, Geneva (Switzerland). Archived from the original (PDF) on 18 September 2017. Also, see Demographics of South Sudan.)
