= Makol Cuei, South Sudan =

Makol Cuei
- boma village
- Location within South Sudan
- Coordinates: 6°22′32″N 31°38′46″E
- Country: South Sudan
- State: Jonglei State
- County: Bor West County (since 2016)
- Payam: Baidit

Makol Cuei is a boma in Baidit payam, Bor West County, Jonglei State, South Sudan, about 30 kilometers north of Bor. The village is located at the southern extent of the sudd, South Sudan's vast central wetlands.

== Demographics ==
According to the Fifth Population and Housing Census of Sudan, conducted in April 2008, Makol Cuei boma had a population of 10,065 people, composed of 5,615 male and 4,450 female residents. (Note: In 2008, at the time of the census, Makol Cuei was located in Bor South County. The data collected during the Fifth Population and Housing Census of Sudan were to be the primary source of information for decisions about the number and demarcation of electoral constituencies and administrative boundaries in what was then southern Sudan. South Sudanese officials rejected census results for southern Sudan. See Darfur Relief and Documentation Centre (2010). 5th Population and Housing Census in Sudan – An Incomplete Exercise (PDF) (Report). Darfur Relief and Documentation Centre, Geneva (Switzerland). Archived from the original (PDF) on September 18, 2017.. Also, see Demographics of South Sudan.)

== Culture and community ==
In March, 2012, a large church, school and health clinic were opened in Makol Cuei, with support from a businessman who had grown up there. The church is the seat of Jonglei State's Athoc diocese.
