= Anuet =

Independent Payam in South Sudan

Anuet payam is an independent payam situated at Bor South County in Jonglei State within South Sudan. Previously, Anuet village used to fall under Pariak boma in former Kolnyang payam.

Anuet payam is located along the world longest river Nile. Anuet payam is bordering Gemeiza County in the current Terekeka State at the South, touches Kalthok and Amatnhom in Eastern Lakes State to the West, Pariak boma/payam to the North and Pibor County in Boma State to the East.

Anuet payam has about four major bomas, which include; Anuet Centre/Thonathiei boma (also known as Majak), Malou boma, Jam boma, Bangachorot boma (also known as Makuach), and other uninhabited bomas like Pinymayom, Alang, Akäy, Pan Pitia, and swampy boma of Laguli.

Anuet payam is the residential home of Abii people, and sharing borders with many communities of South Sudan like Mundari, Murle, Bari, and Aliab respectively.

Anuet payam is a newly created payam as a result of the creation of "28-32 states" leading to creation of more counties in each state, its carry on to generation of more payams and ends up with more bomas. These are politically oriented changes made by the government of South Sudan, as well as, complying with the demands of the local people. However, none disputes president's decrees.

Anuet payam is currently headed by Hon. Manyang Khoor Kuereng, as Civic Administrator (CA). Hon. Manyang was appointed in late 2018 by the former Governor of Jonglei State, Hon. Aguer Panyang to supervise the developmental activities of Abii people. He is the overall supervisor to his local chiefs and reports to the government of state directly until the further notice when the leadership of Bor South County comes into effect after the land crisis is resolved amicably. The CA supervised the following chiefs of Abii community:

1. Chief Kur Mareng Bior, Anuet Centre/thonathiei (Majak) boma.
2. Chief Makuach Mading Ajak, Malou boma.
3. Chief Mabior Anyijong Aruor, Jam boma, North.
4. Chief Makuach Arem Nyok, Jam boma, South.
5. Chief Ayuen Ajakmajoh Makuei, Bangachorot boma.

There is conflict over whether the village is to be named Anuet or Paweel.

Panuet are descendants of Anuet and used to worship ancestral god known as Dengpanuet while living in Anuet.
