= Mayen (disambiguation) =

Mayen is a town in Rhineland-Palatinate, Germany.

Mayen or Mayén may also refer to:

== People ==
=== Given name ===
- Mayen Adetiba (born 1954), Nigerian actress and civil engineer
- Mayen Ngor Atem, South Sudanese politician

=== Middle name ===
- Mario Mayén Meza (born 1968), Salvadorian footballer

=== Surname ===
- Fernando Mayén (born 2003), Mexican gridiron football player
- Gerson Mayen (born 1989), Salvadorian footballer
- Gordon Muortat Mayen (1922–2008), Sudanese revolutionary and politician
- Herta Mayen (1922–2015), Austrian dancer and actress
- Jean Manuel Mayen (1930–2011), Algerian racing cyclist
- Lat Mayen (born 1998), South Sudanese-Australian basketball player
- Lual Mayen, South Sudanese video game developer
- Paul Mayén (1916–2000), Spanish architect
- Peter Mayen, South Sudanese politician
- Simon Makwac Mayen (born 1922), Sudanese politician
- Yuvitza Mayén (born 1999), Guatemalan footballer

== Places ==
- Mayen, South Sudan, a village in Jonglei State, South Sudan
- Tour de Mayen, a mountain in the canton of Vaud, Switzerland

== See also ==
- Mayen-Koblenz, a district in Rhineland-Palatinate, Germany
- Jan Mayen, an island in Norway
