= Thianwei, South Sudan =

Thianwei
- boma village
- Location within South Sudan
- Coordinates: 6°11′28.7″N 31°46′11.7″E
- Country: South Sudan
- State: Jonglei State
- County: Bor East County (since 2016)
- Payam: Anyidi

Thianwei is a boma in Anyidi payam, Bor East County, Jonglei State, South Sudan, about 25 kilometers east of Bor and 5 kilometers from Anyidi village, the administrative center of Anyidi payam.

== Demographics ==
According to the Fifth Population and Housing Census of Sudan, conducted in April 2008, Thianwei boma had a population of 5,636 people, composed of 2,945 male and 2,691 female residents. (Note: In 2008, at the time of the census, Thianwei was located in Bor South County. The data collected during the Fifth Population and Housing Census of Sudan were to be the primary source of information for decisions about the number and demarcation of electoral constituencies and administrative boundaries in what was then southern Sudan. South Sudanese officials rejected census results for southern Sudan. See Darfur Relief and Documentation Centre (2010). 5th Population and Housing Census in Sudan – An Incomplete Exercise (PDF) (Report). Darfur Relief and Documentation Centre, Geneva (Switzerland). Also, see Demographics of South Sudan.)
