= Manydeng, South Sudan =

Machdeng
- boma village
- Country: South Sudan
- State: Jonglei State
- County: Bor West County (since 2016)
- Payam: Baidit

Manydeng is a boma in Baidit payam, Bor West County, Jonglei State, South Sudan, about 30 kilometers north of Bor. The village is located at the southern extent of the sudd, South Sudan's vast central wetlands.

== Education ==
Some of the most prominent schools in Jonglei State are based in Mach-Deng. Mach Deng primary school is one of the oldest in the region and it's believed that Abel Alier started school from there according to the locals.

Baidit Primary school is one of the two primary schools in Mach Deng, it's located few km from the heart of the town called Dingruot. Most state performers from the state National examination come from this school.

== Notable residents ==
- Akon Changkou, South Sudanese Australian model
- Abel Alier Former South Sudanese politician

== Demographics ==
According to the Fifth Population and Housing Census of Sudan, conducted in April 2008, Manydeng boma had a population of 13,308 people, composed of 6,774 male and 6,534 female residents. (Note: In 2008, at the time of the census, Manydeng was located in Bor South County. The data collected during the Fifth Population and Housing Census of Sudan were to be the primary source of information for decisions about the number and demarcation of electoral constituencies and administrative boundaries in what was then southern Sudan. South Sudanese officials rejected census results for southern Sudan. See Darfur Relief and Documentation Centre (2010). 5th Population and Housing Census in Sudan – An Incomplete Exercise (PDF) (Report). Darfur Relief and Documentation Centre, Geneva (Switzerland). Archived from the original (PDF) on September 18, 2017. Also, see Demographics of South Sudan.)
