= Mareng, South Sudan =

Mareng
- boma village
- Location within South Sudan
- Coordinates: 6°11′28.7″N 31°46′11″E
- Country: South Sudan
- State: Jonglei State
- County: Bor East County (since 2016)
- Payam: Anyidi

Mareng is a boma in Anyidi payam, Bor East County, Jonglei State, South Sudan, about 25 kilometers east of Bor.

== Demographics ==
According to the Fifth Population and Housing Census of Sudan, conducted in April 2008, Mareng boma had a population of 10,606 people, composed of 5,560 male and 5,046 female residents. (Note: In 2008, at the time of the census, Mareng was located in Bor South County. The data collected during the Fifth Population and Housing Census of Sudan were to be the primary source of information for decisions about the number and demarcation of electoral constituencies and administrative boundaries in what was then southern Sudan. South Sudanese officials rejected census results for southern Sudan. See Darfur Relief and Documentation Centre (2010). 5th Population and Housing Census in Sudan – An Incomplete Exercise (PDF) (Report). Darfur Relief and Documentation Centre, Geneva (Switzerland). Archived from the original (PDF) on September 18, 2017.. Also, see Demographics of South Sudan.)
