= List of South Sudanese actors =

This is a list of notable actors from the African country of South Sudan, including both actresses and male actors working in any medium. This list includes members of the South Sudanese diaspora.

== A–G ==
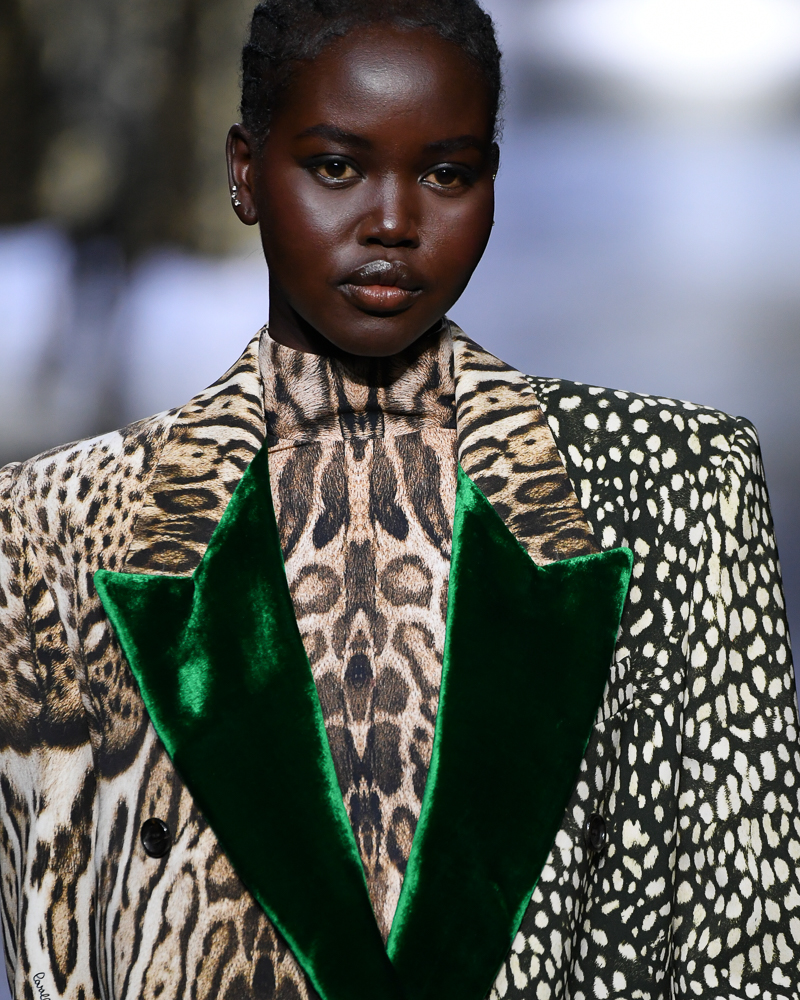
Adut Akech, 2022

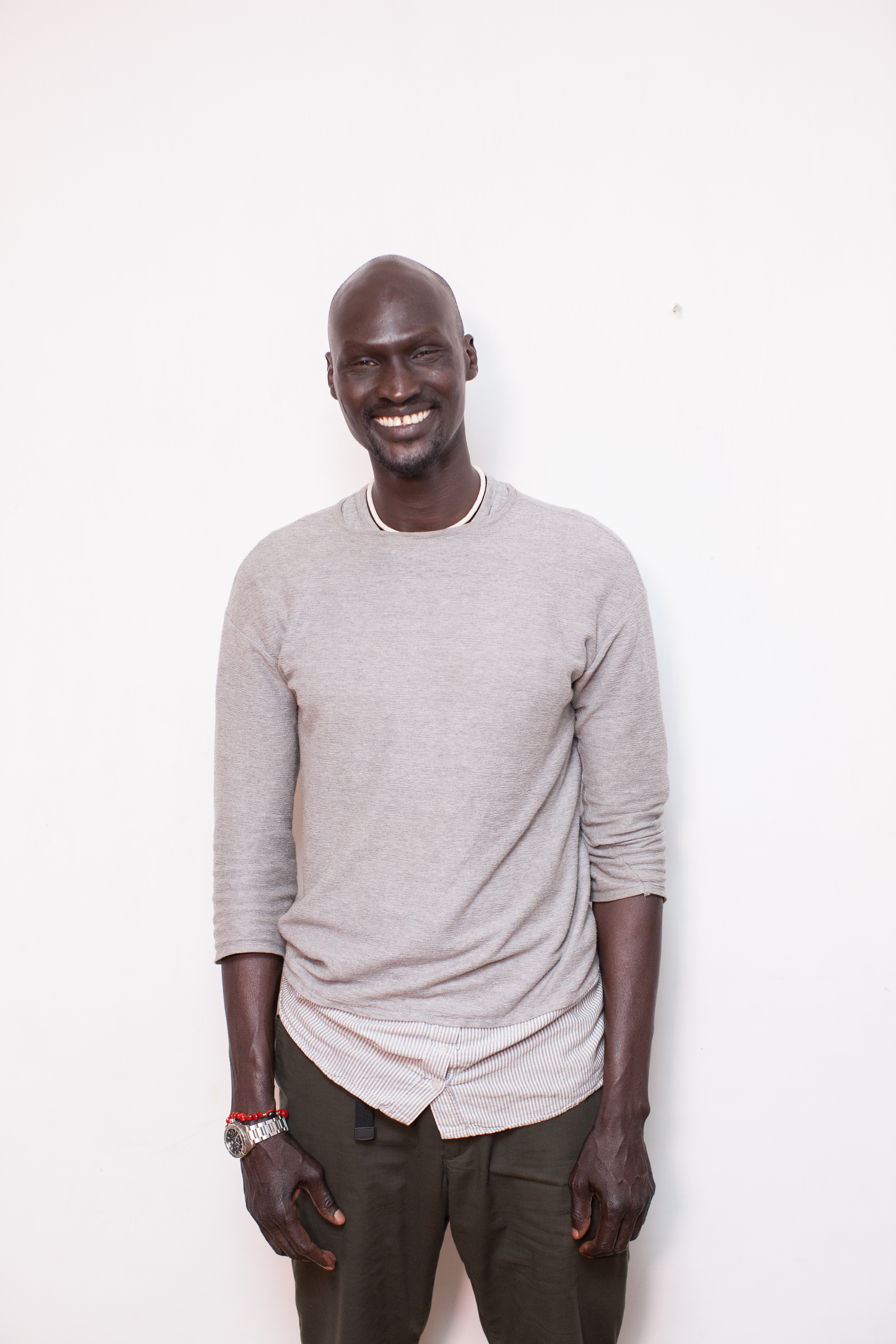
Ger Duany, 2018

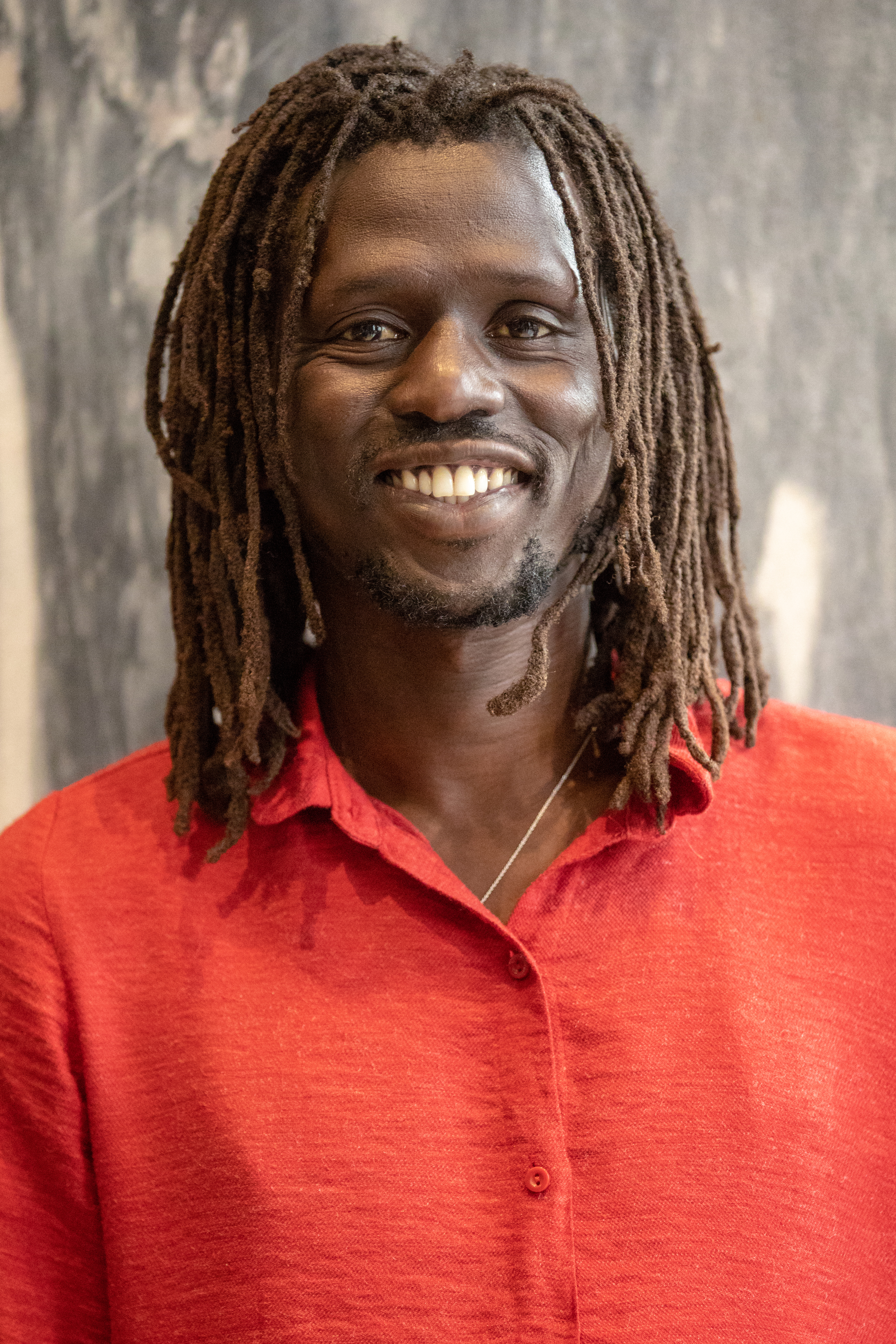
Emmanuel Jal, 2018

- Adut Akech
- Anyier Anei
- Aweng Ade-Chuol
- Alephonsion Deng
- Neveen Dominic
- Ger Duany

== H–M ==
- Emmanuel Jal
- Akau Jambo
- Mari Malek

== N–Z ==
- Alek Wek
- Kuoth Wiel
- Anok Yai

== See also ==
- Cinema of South Sudan
- Juba Film Festival
