= Mayen, South Sudan =

Mayen
- boma village
- Location within South Sudan
- Coordinates: 6°28′31″N 31°29′21″E
- Country: South Sudan
- State: Jonglei State
- County: Bor West County (since 2016)
- Payam: Baidit

Mayen is a boma in Baidit payam, Bor West County, Jonglei State, South Sudan, about 30 kilometers north of Bor. The village is located at the southern extent of the sudd, South Sudan's central wetlands, near to the east bank of the Bahr al Jabal River.

== Demographics ==
According to the Fifth Population and Housing Census of Sudan, conducted in April 2008, Mayen boma had a population of 3,810 people, composed of 1,951 male and 1859 female residents, (Note: In 2008, at the time of the census, Mayen was located in Bor South County. The data collected during the Fifth Population and Housing Census of Sudan were to be the primary source of information for decisions about the number and demarcation of electoral constituencies and administrative boundaries in what was then southern Sudan. South Sudanese officials rejected census results for southern Sudan. See Darfur Relief and Documentation Centre (2010). 5th Population and Housing Census in Sudan – An Incomplete Exercise (PDF) (Report). Darfur Relief and Documentation Centre, Geneva (Switzerland). Archived from the original (PDF) on September 18, 2017.. Also, see Demographics of South Sudan.) who support themselves largely through farming and fishing.
