= Daniel Danis (film director) =

South Sudanese film director

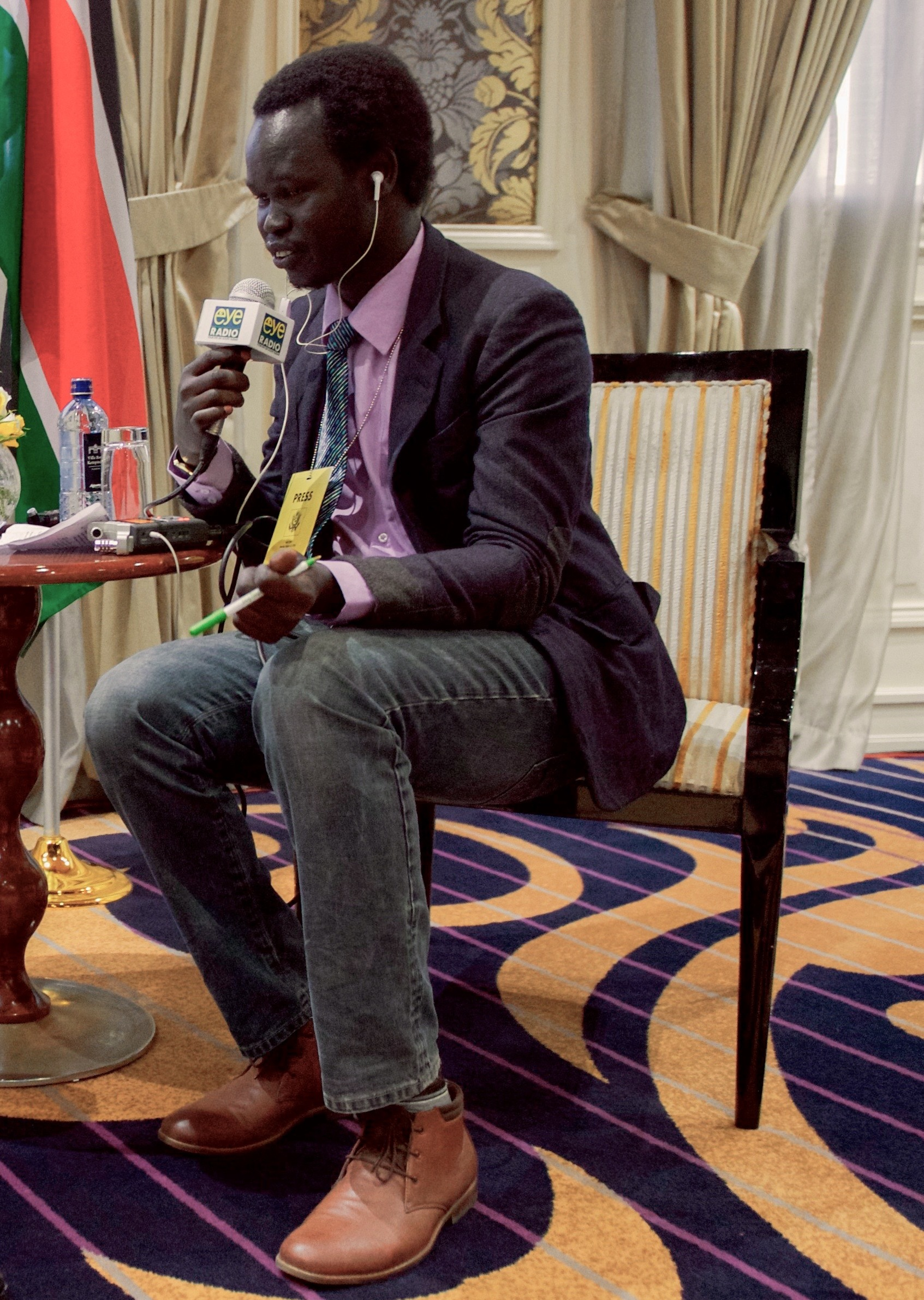
- Danis in 2016
- Born: 1986 (age 39–40)
- Occupations: Film director, radio host
- Notable work: Jamila (2011)

Daniel Danis Okumu Agot (born 1986) is a South Sudanese film director, playwright, radio host, humanitarian and development professional.

== Biography ==
Danis was born in Itang, Ethiopia three years after the Second Sudanese Civil War broke out. He is born to Dinka parents (Dabura Anai Aciek and Agot Nhial Deng) but was raised among the Acholi after his mother remarried an Acholi man (Okumu Ceaser Okello) in 1992. Danis never got to see his biological father. He uses both his biological and foster fathers' names and his surname. His mother escaped from Jalle in Bor North, Jonglei state while pregnant with Danis in 1986, leaving behind her husband, who was a soldier of the rebel group, SPLA - fighting the Sudanese government. Shortly after being born, his mother moved to Dimma refugee camp in Ethiopia where they lived until 1990 before moving back to Itang for the last time. In May 1991, the Ethiopian Peopl's Revolutionary Democratic Front (EPRDF) overthrew President Mengistu Haile Mariam, forcing many Southern Sudanese who were taking refuge in Ethiopa to flee. Danis and his mother were forced back into Southern Sudan.

Between 1991 and 1993, Danis and his mother would be forced to walk on foot for miles across the terrains, rivers and harsh forests that defined the journey from Ethiopia through the Gilo River, Pochalla, and wading landmines, and the onslaught of the Sudanese army's air bombardments. Danis and his mother settled in Pakok/Khor Chum, a temporary haven for communities and refugees traversing the thick bushes from Ethiopia toward South Sudan. After spending almost one year and half in Pakok, Danis' mother took the decision to flee to Kenya, where the lost boys of Sudan had helped established the Kakuma Refugee Camp. They again took another dreadful journey by foot through Pibor into Toposa land under the cover of SPLA soldiers who accompanied the civilians. During this point, the SPLA was planning to capture Kapoeta from the Sudanese army, so the civilians would occasionally come under air bombardment by the Sudanese army. Luckily, Danis and his mother made it to Narus at the border with Kenya.

While in Narus, Danis' mother tried to make a living by brewing and selling local alcohol. But after several air raids and bombardments by Sudanese "gunships," both mother and son took another journey on foot to "Key-base," an outpost of the SPLM/SPLA inside Kenya. It is here that the SPLA advised civilians to continue with the journey towards Lokichoggio and seek the protection of the UNHCR and the Kenyan government. In April 1994, Danis and his mother arrived in Kakuma Refugee Camp.

In 1994, at the age of 8, Danis enrolled at Tarach Nursery school. He later went on to study at Fashoda Primary School, and then moved to Unity Primary School when it was established in 1995 as a multinational school. Danis completed Kenya Certificate of Primary Education in 2002, and enrolled at Bor Town Secondary School, where he completed his high school in 2006.

While in Kakuma, Danis was a star in performance arts, specifically, drama. He was also prominent in the Kakuma Boy Scouts, Debate Club, and basketball, playing under Coach Berhanu for the Zone 5 basketball team. While in primary school, he established the Unity Drama Club and Boys and Girls Scouts, in which he organized and managed training and performances among his peers. In the drama club, Danis produced and directed several skits and plays derived from school text books. In 2001, Danis and his group were selected to perform for the visiting Japanese Prime Minister Yoshiro Mori.

He later joined the Kakuma Central Drama Team, supported by the Lutheran World Federation (LWF/DWS). Here, Danis harnest his talent in drama, poetry and dance - becoming winner of several "best actor" awards in Kakuma and at the division level in Turkana District. in 2004, Danis was appointed Chairman of the Kakuma Central Drama team. In 2005, Danis joined the Participatory Video Project under FilmAid International, where he learned skills in film production. Between 2006 and 2007, Danis with a group of friends, produced, directed and acted in several short films that depicted their daily lives in Kakuma Refugee Camp. Due to his ability to organize his peers and the creative skills he possessed in theatre and film, several NGOs such as Handicap International, GIZ and the National Council of Churches of Kenya (NCCK) recruited Danis to help established the Mobile Theatre Group supported by Handicap International, and Participatory Education Theatre (PET) group supported by NCCK. The group performed skits that raised awareness on landmines, reproductive health, genderbased violence and substance abuse to refugees, host community and those returning to Sudan following the signing of the Comprehensive Peace Agreement (CPA). Danis would later work for NCCK as the Counterpart Manager, providing lifeskills training on HIV/AID prevention, substance abuse, and supervising reproductive health officers in Kakuma.

In May 2007, Danis got the opportunity to travel to Nairobi, Kenya to join the Sudan Radio Service (SRS), the first independent radio, for Sudan that was supported by the U.S State Department and managed by the Education Development Center (EDC). He worked as an English, Dinka and Simple Arabic voice actor for several episodes of radio drama "Let's Talk" that featured themes on peace, reconciliation and development as envisaged in the Sudan Comprehensive Peace Agreement (CPA).

In December 2007, Danis and five of his childhood friends from Kakuma Refugee Camp traveled - for the first time - to Juba, South Sudan. They came home with a dream of establishing a film industry that would provide opportunities for many young people returning to South Sudan after the war, and the propel South Sudan as a country n the rise. While in Juba, they organized several stage dramas at Nyakuron Cultural Center and Home and Away Hotel, which were the hangout of spots for many residents. However, their dream to establish such industry faced several challenges, forcing the group to disband, with some returning to Kakuma and other seeking other opportunities in Juba. Danis returned to Nairobi to continue with his work for Sudan Radio Service (SRS).

After a year with Sudan Radio Service, Danis received his first major contract and assignment as a journalist. He was contracted as a Junior Producer. The role involved script reviews and production of radio drama series, news writing and presentation, and field reporting. For a year, Danis underwent several in-house trainings to become a proficient journalist. He received assignments to cover proceedings at the Southern Sudan Transitional National Legislative Assembly in Juba and also covering the weekly Ministry of Information press briefings. Several government officials noticed Danis ability to identify what’s important as news for the audience through his ability to ask bold relevant questions. By 2010, Danis rose to become an Assistant News Editor. He also got assigned as the station’s Program Editor where he establish several flagship programs for Eye Radio, including “Talk-to-the-People,” a civic engagement program where conversations among local communities and their leaders were held in several residential areas in Juba and Wau.

Danis persuasive writing and spoken words skills enabled him solicit partnership and funding with many NGOs, including bringing onboard the International Republic Institute [IRI] to sponsor South Sudan’s first public debate program that brought together senior government officials and civil society groups to debate on issues that matter to South Sudan. He designed and hosted the monthly public Debate Show, which was also rebroadcast for audiences countrywide. He was also instrumental in designing media campaigns both on radio and for public events. In 2012, Danis became the News Director for Eye Radio (formerly SRS) in 2012. He later served as Partnerships Manager.

While working for Sudan Radio Service (SRS), Danis and his friends from Kakuma, helped found the Woyee Film and Theatre Industry in Juba, South Sudan. Woyee owes its humble beginnings to the efforts of Chandler Griffin, founder of Blue Magnolia Films, and founding director of Barefoot Workshops in Mississippi, US, who provided advice and support as a former FilmAid International trainer at Kakuma Refugee Camp. Griffin initially sponsored two of the refugees, Daniel Danis and Simon Lokwang, to attend a film school in Nairobi to learn more about filmmaking. After completing the course, Lokwang and Danis, along with colleagues, formed Woyee with the dream of establishing a film industry in South Sudan. The group wrote and performed plays on subjects like HIV, domestic violence, civic education, and women's rights. It attracted attention from non-governmental organizations, which hired Woyee to make short educational films. UNDP, IOM and UNHCR contracted Woyee to produce short films to sensitize and empower the public on the Sudan Housing and Population Census, the Sudan General Elections in 2010, and eventually produced and organize several open theatre performances on the Southern Sudan Referendum in 2011. Danis became the group's President. The collective continued to grow and acquired an office in Juba Danis and others devoted the money they made from making films for UN agencies into buying a camera and editing software. The Woyee group rotated the main roles of director, cameraman, actors, and crew among different members.

In 2011, Danis directed the first feature film in South Sudan, Jamila. The plot concerns a young woman, her boyfriend, and an older man interested in her. Because the only cinema in South Sudan had been destroyed, it was screened at a local cultural center. It received an enthusiastic reception from the over 500 people who showed up on the first day, many of whom could not believe it was South Sudanese and drawing comparisons to Nollywood. By 2012, it had attracted over 5,000 students, audience members, and participants. In 2013, Danis helped launch the first film festival in South Sudan. and in 2015, Danis also helped launched the first interschools drama and dance competition, a five day national event that saw the participation of primarcy and secondary schools, colleges and universities competing for various prices. The event was funded by the USAID, and managed by Internews Network.

As a radio presenter, producer and editor at Eye Radio, Danis has interviewed notable figures such as former U.S. Secretary of State John Kerry and former prosecutor of the International Criminal Court, Luis Moreno Ocampo, among others. In 2017, Danis opened a recording studio in Kampala. He assigned the singer S-Bizzy to be the station manager. Known as Jam Records, the studio seeks to promote the work of South Sudanese artists based in Uganda.

In 2021, Danis left radio to pursue a career in humanitarian and development sector. As a former refugee, Danis felt compelled to use his decade of journalism skills to tell stories of people living in conditions perpetuated by conflicts and climate change. He joined Save the Children as Media and Advocacy Coordinator, a role in which he produced several human interest stories that highlighted the challenges and aspirations of children pursuing education, and those in need of health, and protection services. In 2023, Danis rejoined the Education Development Center (EDC), that had returned to South Sudan to implement the USAID-funded Youth Empowerment Activity. The project provided access to basic education, entreprenuership, reproductive health, and civic education opportunities for young people in South Sudan. Danis was recruited as a Communication Specialist, but after four months, EDC assigned him as Acting Deputy Chief of Party after observing his work ethics. leadership, ability to mobilize teams, and his proactiveness within the organization. In November 2024, following the approval by USAID, Danis was formally confirmed as the Deputy Chief of Party. He served in this role, helping reach more than 20,000 youth in remote places with reading and writing skills, business skills, reproductive health messages, and with the skills to participate in civic duties within their communities. Danis later served as the Country Representative for EDC in South Sudan following the closure and termination of USAID projects across the world.

Daniel Danis is the founder of Give South Sudan (GIVESS), a local NGO managing and operating food pantries and food bank, Humanitarian Media and Advocacy Agency, and a co-founder of the South Sudan Press Club and Woyee Film & Theatre Industry. He is also an entrepreneur, running a travel and tourism agency, and pest control company.
