= Cinema of South Sudan =

- No. of screens: None
- Main distributors: None

Cinema is a newly developing industry in South Sudan.

== History ==
The history of cinema in what is now called South Sudan started during the Anglo-Egyptian colonial period in Sudan. In Juba, as in other parts of the country, mobile cinema shows were announced by loudspeakers on the roof of a Landcruiser driving around town. These movie shows were held in the open, often introduced by short speeches that began at sunset. Audiences sat in front of a white piece of cloth, presenting a programme of American comedies and Westerns, short documentaries made by the mobile Sudanese filmmaking unit for a Sudanese public, and feature films made in India, Kenya, and Britain.

South Sudan gained independence in 2011; six years after the conclusion of the Second Sudanese Civil War which led to the closure of Juba's only cinema. In 2011, Daniel Danis directed the first South Sudanese feature film, Jamila. As of 2011, South Sudan did not have a single movie theatre, and most citizens relied on South Sudan Television what was locally called as SSTV. According to the manager of the South Sudanese Government Agency which promotes filming and arts of creativity, Elfatih Majok Atem, "Many local filmmakers have never had any training so they could teach themselves on the job of filmmaking. Those who are experts face the challenge of accessing good equipment and tools and are affected by the lack of support and encouragement from its citizens".

== Film festival ==
In 2016, South Sudan hosted its first film festival, the Juba Film Festival. The festival included a film industry conference, and the second scheduled to be held in South Sudan. Founded by Simon Bingo, the festival was intended to alleviate the negative image of South Sudan as a war-torn country as well as to promote South Sudanese culture and art.

== Groups ==
Several groups in the country seek to promote filmmaking by local filmmakers:

- Woyee Film and Theatre Industry, a filmmaking collective.
- The Cinematography and Film Industry Section of the Ministry of Culture, Youth and Sports.
- Movie and TV Academy, a private school in Juba.
- Nyakuron Cultural Center, the host for the 2016 Juba Film Festival.
- Angel Films 211
- Gabuu Myles Films
- Rutaan Film
- Hayatna Drama Group

== See also ==
- Arab cinema
- List of South Sudanese actors
