= Kolnyang =

- Payam (administrative division)
- Country: South Sudan
- State: Jonglei State
- County: Bor County (since 2016)
- Payam: Kolnyang
- Seat: Kolnyang

Kolnyang is a Payam in Bor County, in Jonglei State, South Sudan. It is situated on the east side of the Bahr al Jabal River, to the south of Bor, South Sudan. Kolnyang’s Malual-Chaat was where the liberation revolution that led to South Sudan independence started. Both 105 Battalion commander Alier NhialMangardit and the first fallen hero of revolt Maker Jool were from Kolnyang. Kolnyang Payam is Bor county’s southernmost payam, bordering Central Equatoria State to southwest, Pibor Administrative Area to the east, Lake State to the west and Eastern Equatoria State to the southeast.

== History ==
=== Malek mission site ===
The area encompassed by Kolnyang Payam was, in the early nineteenth century, the site of one of the Malek Mission, the first permanent Church Mission Society (CMS) station in southern Sudan. (Note: There were, of course, earlier permanent missions, such as the American mission station at Doleib Hill. Malek was the first CMS mission in southern Sudan.) Angus Cameron, the Governor of Mongalla, had discouraged the missionaries from settling Mongalla and suggested a site downriver, 18 kilometers south of Bor. Llewellyn Gwynne oversaw the group that established the Malek Mission in early 1906. It consisted of Rev. Archibald Shaw, Rev. Arthur Thom, Rev. F.B. Hadow, Dr. Lloyd, Mr. Comely, and Mr. Wilmott. The mission closed (temporarily) fewer than two years later, in May 1908, when only Archibald Shaw remained there; the others had all left, owing to a combination of ill-health and frustration. A Church Mission Society school was subsequently established at the mission, providing one of the few opportunities for access to education in the region.

=== Panpandiar ===
The Division 8 Headquarters of the Sudan People's Liberation Army (SPLA) is located at Panpandiar, which lies along the Bahr al Jabal River, sixty kilometers south of Bor, between Malek and Pariak boma. In December 2013, Major-General Peter Gadet, the Commander of SPLA Division 8 Headquarters in Panpandiar, defected from the SPLA along with many of the soldiers under his command and attacked Bor Town.

=== panwel/Anuet ===
More than 30 people were killed during a series of disputes over the ownership of dry-season grazing land and the naming a village in the vicinity of Cuei-keer in 2017-2018. Conflict arose over whether a village then known as Panweel would retain its name or be renamed Anuet.

== Demographics ==
In 2008, Kolnyang was composed of four bomas: Cuei-keer, Gak, Kolnyang, and Pariak. According to the Fifth Population and Housing Census of Sudan, conducted in April 2008, Kolnyang had a combined population of 40,058 people, composed of 21,188 male and 18,870 female residents. (Note: The data collected during the Fifth Population and Housing Census of Sudan were to be the primary source of information for decisions about the number and demarcation of electoral constituencies and administrative boundaries in what was then southern Sudan. South Sudanese officials rejected census results for southern Sudan. See Darfur Relief and Documentation Centre (2010). 5th Population and Housing Census in Sudan – An Incomplete Exercise (PDF) (Report). Darfur Relief and Documentation Centre, Geneva (Switzerland). Archived from the original (PDF) on 18 September 2017.. Also, see Demographics of South Sudan.)

Kolnyang is home to eleven major communities. These are Adol, Abang, Gol, Gwalla, Jiir, Koro, Malual, Nyara, Biong, Manyayiel, Nyicak, Pariak and Awan.
