= Gak, South Sudan =

Coordinates: 8°05′N 28°54′E

Gak
- boma village
- Location within South Sudan
- Country: South Sudan
- State: Jonglei State
- County: Bor South County (since 2016)
- Payam: Kolnyang

Gak is a boma in Kolnyang payam, Bor South County, Jonglei State, South Sudan.

== Demographics ==
According to the Fifth Population and Housing Census of Sudan, conducted in April 2008, Gak boma had a population of 3,077 people, composed of 1,570 male and 1,507 female residents. (Note: In 2008, at the time of the census, Gak was located in Bor South County. The data collected during the Fifth Population and Housing Census of Sudan were to be the primary source of information for decisions about the number and demarcation of electoral constituencies and administrative boundaries in what was then southern Sudan. South Sudanese officials rejected census results for southern Sudan. See Darfur Relief and Documentation Centre (2010). 5th Population and Housing Census in Sudan – An Incomplete Exercise (PDF) (Report). Darfur Relief and Documentation Centre, Geneva (Switzerland). Archived from the original (PDF) on 18 September 2017. Also, see Demographics of South Sudan.)
