= Boma, South Sudan =

Boma
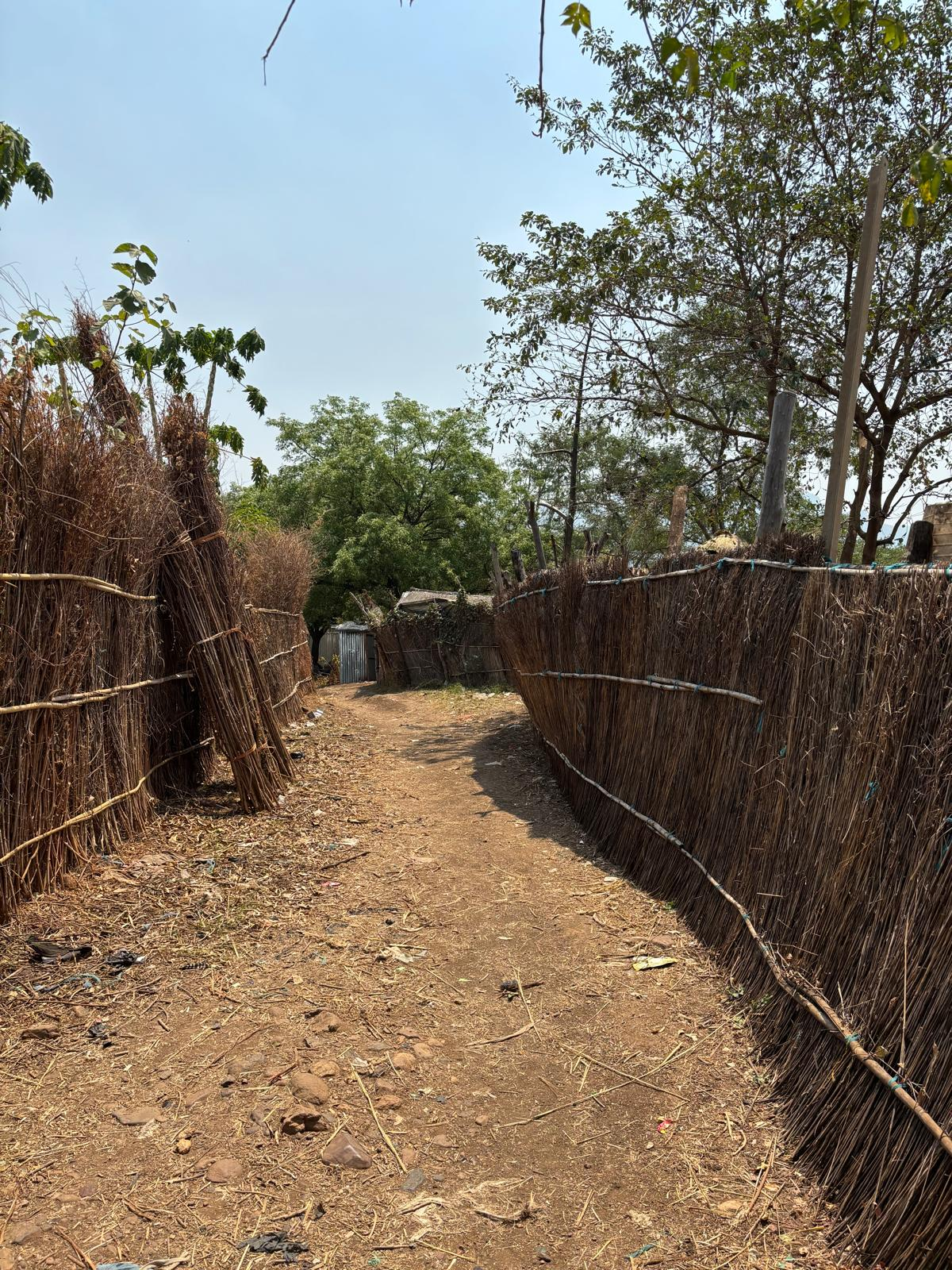
- A residential street in Boma

- Location in South Sudan before creation of new states
- Coordinates: 6.1805°N 34.3888°E
- Country: South Sudan
- State: Pibor Administrative Area
- County: Pibor County
- Payam: Boma
- Boma: Boma
- Time zone: UTC+2 (CAT)
- Climate: Aw

Boma or Jebel Boma is a town in South Sudan. It is located in Pibor County, Pibor Administrative Area, near the border with Ethiopia.

== Overview ==
Name of Boma comes from Arabic meaning Owl and it was given by Arab traders moving around Boma. Boma was the first town captured by the Sudan People's Liberation Army at the beginning of its insurgency in 1983. The SPLA subsequently used the town's name for the lowest-level administrative division in the territory it controlled, which continues in modern-day South Sudan.

More recently, the town of Boma has been at the center of the insurgency of the South Sudan Democratic Movement led by David Yau Yau.

== Transport ==
A road connects Boma to Raad along the border of Ethiopia. Another road leads southwest out of Boma, through the park via Kassangor to the town of Kapoeta . The town is also served by Boma Airstrip.

== Population ==
In 2008 population of Boma was 1,462

== Points of interest ==
Boma National Park, the largest national park in South Sudan, lies to the west of Boma.
