= Angakuei =

The Angakuei community belong to the people (Angakueth- adjective) are members of the clan from Baidit Payam, Jonglei, South Sudan. The word Angakuei originates from the word Kuei, which means eagle. Abel Alier, the first South Sudanese to become the first vice President of The Sudan and the first president of the High Executive Council of Southern Sudan, is from the Angakuei clan. The name Alier originates from Lirpiou (god of the peaceful heart) a deity that was worshipped by Angakueth (majorly descendants of Kut Ajak Jooh) and their brothers, Gwallɛi (descendants of Rith Ajak Jooh) who are currently in Kolnyang Payam of Bor County.

Angakuei is arguably the largest of all the tribal groups in Dinka Bor, and is divided into about 7 subsections namely: Leek Ajak, Kwai Ajak ( H.E Abel Alier is from this subsection), Deng Ajak (commonly known as Nyang Deng Ajak), Hol (also known Kuot Kut), Lith, Dongduor, Pen, and Akuak (the riverine section of Angakuei). The first three subsections of Angakuei (Leek (which includes Tong), Kwai and Deng) are named after the sons of Ajak Thiong and Nyiel-Aguet Angoh, with Tong which is within Leek being the eldest of the four, Leek being the second, Kwai being the third and Deng as the last born.

This order may confuse some people because others believe that Tong is not Ajak's biologically son despite being the first born. It is believed that Nyiel-Aguet was already pregnant before she was married to Ajak Thiong.

Cattle Camps

Onland Cattle Camps

1. Paleep ( Mainly for the descendants of Gar Kut under Leek, Kwai and Deng subsections)
2. Rɛrou
3. Wuon-Athony
4. Yar-Akäu
5. Bari
6. Panyiei
7. Pariak
8. Pangui
9. Wunthony
10. Thianwong

Riverine Cattle Camps

1. Nyinnhom - (Deng Ajak + Pen)
2. Akuak - (Leek Ajak + Kwai Ajak)
3. Achiɛ̈ɛ̈r - (BärLith)
4. Nɛ̈knyang - (Dongduor)

Notable figures

1. H.E. Abel Alier Kwai Kut - Politician
2. Hon. Bullen Alier-Beer Bior Ajak - Politician
3. Bullen Alier-Butic Anyieth Ngong - Politician/Journalist
4. Abdalla Lueth Ajak - Chief
5. Daniel Deng Kwai Kut -Chief
6. Ajak-Guong Bior Gaar - Chief
7. Gideon Alier Aluong - Paramount Chief
8. Abui Nyang Deng - Warrior
9. Alier Monydhal Yuang - Soloist/ Poet
10. Alier-Yollo Agotic Ngong - Soloist/Poet
11. Abijok Deng Achuony - Soloist/Poet

== See also ==
- Culture of South Sudan
- History of South Sudan
- National Archives of South Sudan
