= Pariak =

- boma village
- Location within South Sudan
- Coordinates: 5°58′17.9″N 31°39′39.9″E
- Country: South Sudan
- State: Jonglei State
- County: Bor South County (since 2016)
- Payam: Kolnyang

Pariak is a boma in Kolnyang payam, Bor South County, Jonglei State, South Sudan. Pariak town is a regional trading hub located about 30 kilometers south of Bor along the Bor-Juba road. It is the most populous boma in Kolnyang payam.

== Demographics ==
According to the Fifth Population and Housing Census of Sudan, conducted in April 2008, Pariak boma had a population of 22,619 people, composed of 11,583 male and 11,036 female residents. (Note: In 2008, at the time of the census, Pariak was located in Bor South County. The data collected during the Fifth Population and Housing Census of Sudan were to be the primary source of information for decisions about the number and demarcation of electoral constituencies and administrative boundaries in what was then southern Sudan. South Sudanese officials rejected census results for southern Sudan. See Darfur Relief and Documentation Centre (2010). 5th Population and Housing Census in Sudan – An Incomplete Exercise (PDF) (Report). Darfur Relief and Documentation Centre, Geneva (Switzerland). Archived from the original (PDF) on 18 September 2017. Also, see Demographics of South Sudan.)

== Infrastructure ==
In 2008, Kuol Manyang, then the Governor of Jonglei State, announced that the Government of South Sudan had contracted a Chinese construction firm to build a bridge across the Bahr al Jabal river at Pariak, linking Jonglei State and what was then Lakes State. The bridge was never built.
