= Jalle =

- Payam (administrative division)
- Country: South Sudan
- State: Jonglei State
- County: Bor North County (since 2016)
- Payam: Jalle

Jalle is a Payam in Bor North County, in Jonglei State, South Sudan. It is situated on the east side of the Bahr al Jabal River between Bor and Twic East.

== History ==
Jalle was first established as court centre in 1930s during British colonialism. In 1988, during the Second Sudanese Civil War (1983–2005), a MiG-23MS crashed in Jalle Payam near Kolmarek. SPLA Radio reported at the time that the jet had suffered from a technical fault. It was sometimes later reported that the plane had been brought down by the SPLA. The aircraft's pilot, a second lieutenant from Benghazi, Libya, was captured by people living near the crash site and turned over to the Sudan People's Liberation Army (SPLA). The pilot and his aircraft were held out by the SPLA as "concrete evidence" of foreign involvement in the Second Sudanese Civil War.

== Demographics ==
Jalle is composed of four bomas: Akuai-deng, Jalle, Kolmarek, and Kuei-juet. (Note: A number of reports incorrectly state that Jalle is composed of five bomas. This confusion may stem from references to "boma level villages," a phrase indicating that a village is small, not that it is a unit of local government. For example, see Winrock International & United Nations Development Program (UNDP) (2011). Annex IV BRIDGE Winrock Q1 Report FY 2012 – Bor County Profile (PDF) (Report). USAID. Archived from the original (PDF) on 10 February 2017.) According to the Fifth Population and Housing Census of Sudan, conducted in April 2008, Jalle had a combined population of 13,506 people, composed of 7,024 male and 6,482 female residents. (Note: The data collected during the Fifth Population and Housing Census of Sudan were to be the primary source of information for decisions about the number and demarcation of electoral constituencies and administrative boundaries in what was then southern Sudan. South Sudanese officials rejected census results for southern Sudan. See Darfur Relief and Documentation Centre (2010). 5th Population and Housing Census in Sudan – An Incomplete Exercise (PDF) (Report). Darfur Relief and Documentation Centre, Geneva (Switzerland). Archived from the original (PDF) on 18 September 2017.. That the majority of the 20,520 returnees who re-settled in Bor County between January and November, 2008, settled in Baidit Payam (owing to flooding in Jalle and better access to humanitarian aid in Baidit) is cited as a reason for an under-count of residents in Jalle Payam during the Fifth Population and Housing Census of Sudan, conducted in April 2008. See Food Security Technical Secretariat of the GoSS. Southern Sudan Food Security Update, November 2008 (Report). GOSS, FAO, WFP. p. 4. and Wël, PaanLuel (17 September 2016). "What are the respective population sizes of the 14 new counties in Jonglei state?". paanluelwel.com. PaanLuel Wël. Also, see Demographics of South Sudan)

Jalle is home to Juet, Aboudit, and Alian communities.
