= Juba Film Festival =

Annual film festival in South Sudan (est. 2016)

- Founded: 2016; 10 years ago
- Type: Film Festival
- Headquarters: Juba, South Sudan
- Director: Simon Bingo
- Website: https://www.facebook.com/JubaFilmFestival

The Juba Film Festival (JFF) is an annual film festival held in Juba, South Sudan. Founded in 2016 by filmmaker Simon Bingo, the festival is attended by thousands of people every year. In addition to producing the festival, JFF produces films and provides training in filmmaking.

== History ==
JFF was founded by Simon Bingo,^{α} a South Sudanese filmmaker who first learned about movies through FilmAid while living in Kakuma Refugee Camp in Kenya. He attended film school in Nairobi and worked as a FilmAid facilitator before moving to Juba in 2009 and working for SSBC TV. Bingo has said he founded JFF to promote South Sudanese culture beyond its war-torn image and to share local stories, including films about social issues that would not be allowed on the government TV channel.

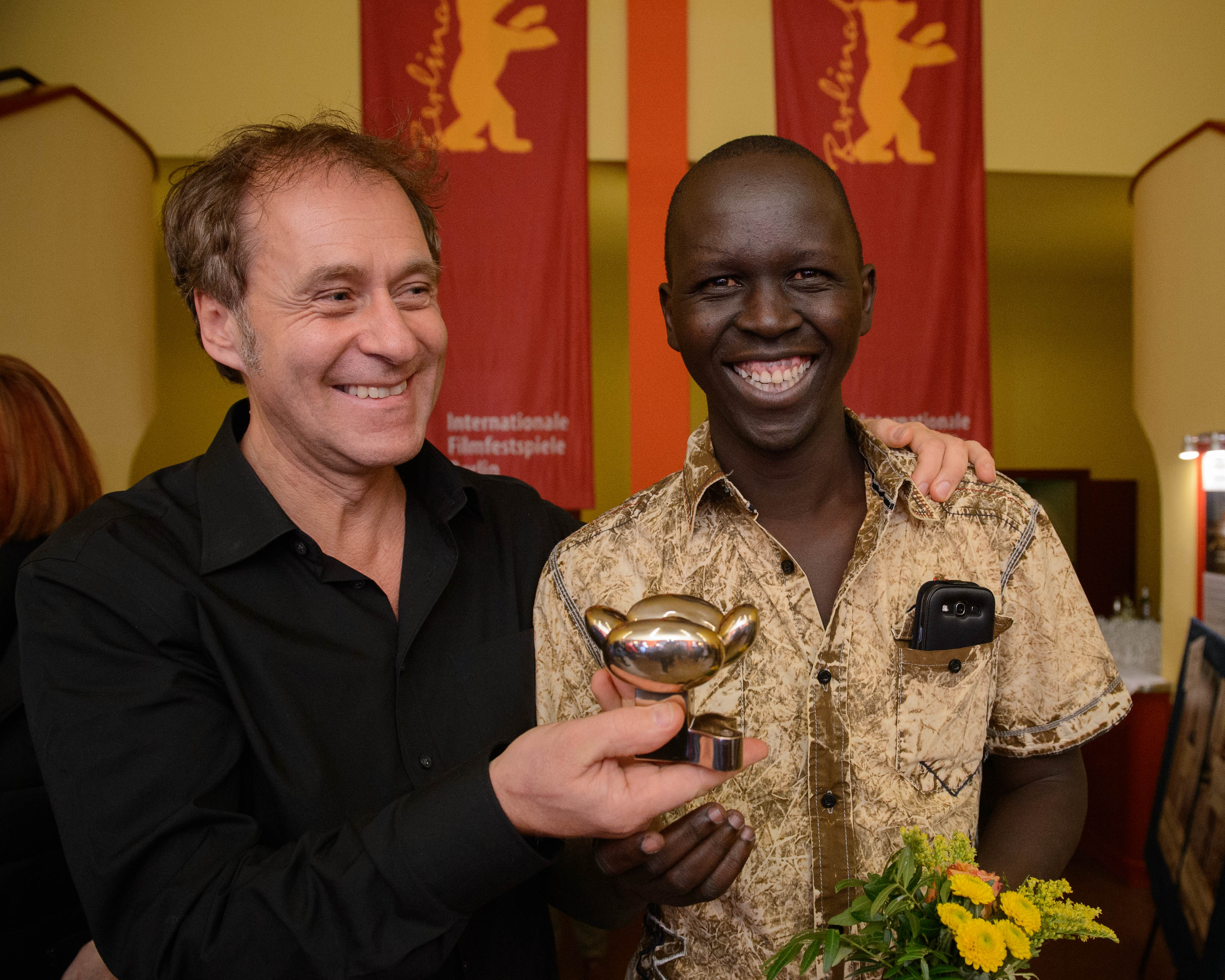
Juba Film Festival director Simon Bingo (R) with Hubert Sauper in 2014

Additionally, JFF hoped to build a local film industry that would eventually have a global reach. As of 2016, there were no cinemas or film schools in the country. For several months before the first festival was held, JFF provided mentorship for 20 Sudanese students in filmmaking as they worked to create four films for the festival.

The festival premiered in July 2016 and featured 31 films screened in various locations including the Nyakuron Cultural Center and the University of Juba. Later that year, a five hour screening of all the winning films was held at Nyakuron Cultural Center as well as a workshop about filmmaking with mobile phones.

Shortly after the 2016 festival ended, fighting broke out in Juba, and Bingo temporarily fled with his family to Kampala, Uganda. Although the 2017 film festival was delayed due to the civil unrest; it was attended by 15,000 people. According to festival organizers, the quality and number of films submitted to the festival increased compared to the previous year. The featured films covered topics like child marriage, intimate partner violence, and currency shortages. The winning film, entitled Waja Ta Jena (Pain of a Child), tells the story of a girl who drops out of school after becoming pregnant.

The third festival was held in December 2018 and featured sixty films. The fourth festival was attended by 22,000 people and featured forty six films screened over three days.

In 2024, four films from JFF were submitted to the Zanzibar International Film Festival.

== Activities ==
According to their website, JFF organizes film festivals, provides training in filmmaking, and produces films.

Award categories for the film festival include: Best Director, Best Actor, Best Actress, Best Supporting Actor, Best Supporting Actress, Best Camera, Best Video Editor, and Best Foreign Film. Screenings are held at multiple venues including university buildings, hotels, restaurants, and football fields, and the awards ceremony typically occurs at the Nyakuron Cultural Center. USAID, the local German embassy, and the European Union have provided funding for the festival.

== Notes ==
^α His name is also written as Simon “Bingo” Lokwang Paul or Paul Simon Lokwang or Simon Lokwang.

== See also ==
- Cinema of South Sudan
