= Anyidi, South Sudan =

Anyidi
- Payam (administrative division)
- Country: South Sudan
- State: Jonglei State
- County: Bor East County (since 2016)
- Payam: Anyidi

Anyidi is a Payam in Bor County, in Jonglei State, South Sudan. It is situated to the east of Bor, the capital of Jonglei State, on the road connecting Bor and Pibor, in Boma State.

== History ==
Anyidi was first established as a court center in 1946. In 1987, most of red army passed through Anyidi for Ethiopia. Anyidi borders Greater Pibor Administrative area (GPAA) near Machabol. Some of the prominent leaders from Anyidi payam include Judge Martin Majier Gai Ayuel, Geu Atherkuei, Herjok Akuom, Maker Thiong Maal, Jok Riak Makol and many others. During September, 2016, Anyidi was the site of the Anyidi Peace Conference, which established a joint police force for Boma State and Jonglei State to prevent cattle raiding and child abductions.

== Demographics ==
Anyidi is composed of three bomas. These are Thianwei, Chuei Magon and Mareng. According to the Fifth Population and Housing Census of Sudan, conducted in April 2008, Anyidi had a combined population of 34,882 people, composed of 18,164 male and 16,718 female residents. (Note: The data collected during the Fifth Population and Housing Census of Sudan were to be the primary source of information for decisions about the number and demarcation of electoral constituencies and administrative boundaries in what was then southern Sudan. South Sudanese officials rejected census results for southern Sudan. See Darfur Relief and Documentation Centre (2010). 5th Population and Housing Census in Sudan – An Incomplete Exercise (PDF) (Report). Darfur Relief and Documentation Centre, Geneva (Switzerland). Archived from the original (PDF) on September 18, 2017. Also, see Demographics of South Sudan.)

Anyidi is home to the Palek community.
