= Jamila (film) =

2011 South Sudanese film

- Directed by: Daniel Danis
- Release date: 2011
- Country: South Sudan

Jamila is a South Sudanese feature film, "the first feature film to be produced by South Sudanese people". It was directed by Daniel Danis in 2011.

Jamila tells the story of a woman, her boyfriend and a suitor who is older and richer.

The film was produced by the Woyee Film and Theatre Industry, formed by refugees returning to Juba from the Kakuma refugee camp in Kenya, where the non-governmental organization FilmAid International had taught them film-making skills. On their return to Juba, the group of over fifty individuals made short films for United Nations agencies, rotating key roles amongst themselves and earning money to buy camera and editing equipment. Since Juba's only cinema had been destroyed during the war, the film needed to be shown in a local cultural centre. Over 500 people showed up to the first screening, with a larger number attending the second screening.
