= Bor Airport (South Sudan) =

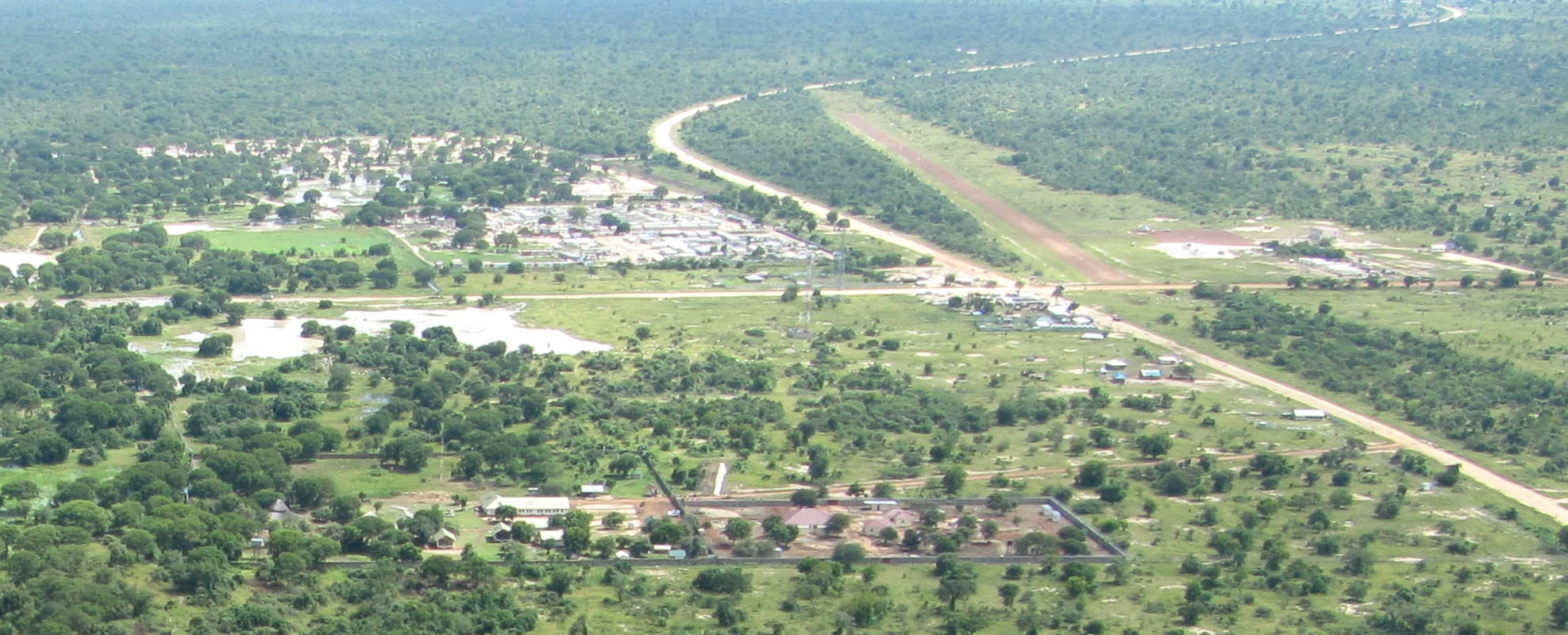
- Bor Airport seen from the air
- IATA: none; ICAO: HSBR

Summary
- Airport type: Public
- Owner: Civil Aviation Authority of South Sudan
- Serves: Bor
- Location: Bor, South Sudan
- Elevation AMSL: 407 m / 1,335 ft
- Coordinates: 06°11′47″N 31°36′05″E

Map
- Location of Bor Airport in South Sudan

Runways
Direction	Length		Surface
Direction	m	ft	Surface
01/19	1,280	4,200	Dirt

Bor Airport (ICAO: HSBR) is a small public airport in Bor County, Jonglei State, in the Greater Upper Nile region of South Sudan, that serves the city of the same name and surrounding communities. It is the only airport in the state.

== Location ==
Bor Airport is located near the city of Bor. The airport is located about 8 kilometres (5.0 mi) by road south-east of Bor's central business district.

This location lies approximately 150 kilometres (93 mi), by air, north of Juba International Airport, the largest airport in South Sudan. Bor Airport sits at an elevation of 407 metres (1,335 ft) above sea level. The airport has a single dirt runway that is 1,280 m (4,200 ft) long, labelled as runway 01/19.

== See also ==
- Bor, South Sudan, the city in which the airport is situated and which it serves
- Jonglei State
- List of airports in South Sudan
