= National Convention of New Sudan =

The National Convention of New Sudan was an assembly organized by the Sudan People's Liberation Army/Movement (SPLA/M) in Chukudum, Eastern Equatoria April 2-13, 1994. Over five hundred delegates took part in the event. The convention focused on questions of governance, rather than strategies of the ongoing war with the government in Khartoum.

The National Convention had initially been scheduled to coincide with the tenth anniversary of the founding of the SPLA/M, May 16, 1993. It had however been postponed. A Convention Organising Committee (COC), consisting of 35 military officials of SPLA, had been formed to prepare the event. The COC was led by Yousif Kuwa, who also chaired the convention.

In his opening speech at the convention, the SPLA/M Chairman John Garang declared the convention as sovereign body. The convention established a system of three branches of government in New Sudan; legislative, executive and judicial.

The issue of union (i.e. unity of Sudan) and separatism was dealt with at the convention. John Garang, who preferred unity, accepted a shift in policy of the movement which accommodated separatist demands. 'New Sudan' was defined as applying only to the 'liberated areas' under the control of SPLA/M, in contrast to the unionist definition in the original SPLA/M Manifesto which had defined 'New Sudan' as a future united, secular Sudan. The election of the new SPLA/M leadership carried the mandate of 'to fight and achieve the right of Self-determination for the oppressed people of the New Sudan'. A system of local governments was formalized, with five levels (boma, payam, county, region and central). Five regional administrations of New Sudan were created, namely Bahr el-Ghazal, Equatoria, Southern Blue Nile, Southern Kordofan and Upper Nile. The convention instituted reforms of the legal system in the areas under SPLA/M control. Various laws, such as the New Sudan Penal Code and New Sudan Traffic Act, were drafted.

The convention elected a new National Liberation Council/National Executive Committee of SPLA/M. John Garang was elected chairman and Salva Kiir deputy chairman, both unopposed.
