= Boma Airstrip =

- IATA: n/a; ICAO: n/a

Summary
- Airport type: Public, Civilian
- Owner: n/a
- Serves: Boma National Park, South Sudan
- Location: Towot, South Sudan
- Coordinates: 06°10′50″N 034°23′20″E

Map
- Location of Boma Airstrip in South Sudan

Runways
Direction	Length		Surface
Direction	ft	m	Surface
n/a	-	-	Unpaved

Boma Airstrip is an airport in South Sudan.

== Location ==
Boma Airstrip (IATA: n/a, ICAO: n/a) is located in Pibor County, Jonglei State, in eastern South Sudan, near the town of Towot.

This location lies approximately 341 kilometres (212 mi), by air, north of Juba International Airport, the largest airport in South Sudan. The geographic coordinates of this airport are: 6° 10' 50.74"N, 34° 23' 20.62"E (Latitude: 6.180763; Longitude: 34.389063). The elevation of Boma Airstrip is unknown. The airport has a single unpaved runway, the dimensions of which are not publicly known at this time.

== Overview ==
Boma Airstrip is a small civilian airport that serves the town of Towot and Boma National Park. There are no known scheduled airlines serving this airport at this time, but the United Nations Humanitarian Air Service served the field from Juba International Airport.

== See also ==
- Jonglei
- List of airports in South Sudan
