= Juba–Bor Highway =

Road in South Sudan

Route information
- Length: 202 km (126 mi)

Location
- Country: South Sudan

Highway system
- Transport in South Sudan

The Juba–Bor Highway is a 202-kilometre dual-carriageway road in South Sudan connecting Juba, the country's capital and largest city, to Bor, capital of Jonglei State to the north.

== History ==
The route between Juba and Bor, one of the main arteries in South Sudan, used to be a dirt road that became "almost impassable" to traffic after heavy rain. It was the location of fighting during the South Sudanese Civil War.

In 2014, South Korean engineers with the United Nations Mission in South Sudan (UNMISS) repaired the road.

The Juba–Bor road was subsequently reconstructed and paved along mostly the same alignment as the old one. The present, 202-km tarmac road was constructed by Africa Resources Corporation (ARC), a local company, and inaugurated in January 2023.

== Security ==
Many violent ambushes have occurred along the road. In May 2017, some 40 people were killed in a single ambush. That year, UNMISS peacekeepers began patrolling the highway to improve security.

An attack on cattle traders in November 2024 left 22 people dead. A spate of ambushes in 2025 prompted the South Sudan People's Defence Forces (SSPDF) to deploy troops to the highway.
