= Archibald Shaw =

British missionary

Archdeacon Archibald Shaw (8 June 1879 – 1956) was a pioneer missionary amongst the Dinka people with the Gordon Memorial Sudan Mission of the Church Missionary Society (CMS) in southern Sudan in the first half of the 20th century.

== An Englishman by origin ==
Archibald Shaw was born on 8 June 1879 in Birmingham. His father was Walter Shaw, manufacturer of Machine Tools who was described as "a man of integrity" and a Christian. His mother was Julia Whitehouse of Billesley Hall, Kings Heath, Worcestershire before her marriage. Archibald was one of five children - 2 sons and 3 daughters. Archibald Shaw was a proud Englishman whose conversion to Christ led him to love and serve Africans.

== Education and calling ==
Shaw was educated at Bromsgrove School, Emmanuel College, and Ridley Hall, Cambridge, and ordained by the Bishop of Bath and Wells in 1903 serving his curacy at Walcot, Bath. But it lasted only 2 years for he soon began his distinguished missionary career.

He was accepted for missionary service in the pioneer work of the Gordon Memorial Sudan Mission of the Church Missionary Society (C.M.S.) in 1904. C.M.S. was one of the societies invited by Lord Cromer, the British resident in Egypt, to begin work in the Southern region of the Sudan.

== The pioneer missionary ==
The pioneer party of six young missionaries were received by Llewellyn Henry Gwynne (later to become Archdeacon, then Assistant Bishop to the Bishop in Jerusalem and finally Bishop of Egypt and the Sudan.) They were delayed some months in Khartoum making preparations to sail southwards. A large boat was purchased and extensively refitted and enlarged. With two sails it could travel under its own power but was also towed on occasion by a river steamer. Gwynne led the party and Dr Albert Cook came up from Uganda to meet them on arrival at their Dinka landing place.

The Endeavour, as the boat was named, sailed from Khartoum in December 1905. They landed and set up their first camp at the small village of Malual, on the East Bank of the Nile. It lies about 6 miles south of the government post, Bor and 4 miles north of Malek. It was some time before the confidence of the local Dinka folk was won and progress was slow. Archibald Shaw was the only one of the pioneer party of six to return from leave and carry on. He too might have given up had he agreed to leave his post when very ill with malaria and pressed by the Governor General to do so when he called with his steamer at Malek. But Shaw believed that if he had done so that would have been either the end or at least considerable delay in getting the work established. Shaw continued to make the East Bank Bor Dinka his speciality throughout his mission. To Malual and Malek was added an outstation at Gwalla about ten miles inland from Malek.

== ’Macuor’ of the Dinka ==
Shaw was very dedicated to the Dinka people and learnt the language well. He was called Macuor by the Dinka, the name by which he is still remembered throughout Dinka land. The name Macuor was his Bull name, following the Dinka custom of naming young men by their favourite bulls. The prefix Ma- denotes an ox or bull and the word following usually derives from a natural object whose colour is similar to the particular bull. It is not a matter of character, only colour. The Archdeacon's bull was supposed to resemble a vulture's colouring and the choice of the name for the Arch. was nothing to do with Vulture characteristics!

== The translator ==
Shaw gave high priority to the translation and distribution of the Bible. This occupied more and more of his time in the last years of his active missionary service and was continued with considerable success after his retirement despite the obvious difficulties caused by being away from Sudan. At great personal expense he took Dinkas about with him and almost always there were one or more with him in Kenya and indeed on occasion in England.

He recognised the obligation of translators to make a real contribution to vernacular secular literature also and his work in this field included a Reading Primer, a hygiene book, a manuscript issued by the Ministry of Education entitled "Travel by Land", which reached 14 pages with pictures, and was circulated by the Department for use in schools.

From early days Shaw set himself to produce, and from time to time increase, and improve, the Dinka Prayer Book. In this way he did his best to provide a framework for worthy worship in the liturgical services. First there were two books - one containing prayers and services, the other a hymn book. At first he insisted on confining hymn tunes to the pentatonic scale. He recognised on the one hand that educated Dinka boys soon found that they could manage the semi-tones to complete the Octave as in Western music, and on the other hand that natural Dinka singing embraced a scale beyond both. But Western tunes had to be pentatonic - either originally or by adaptation. So when the Dinka Prayer and Hymn Book in Bor dialect was published in 1930 it revealed a long step forward in Dinka worship which was both liturgically sound and accurately "Dinka".

== Mission responsibilities ==
Shaw was Secretary of the Gordon Memorial Sudan Mission from 1907 to 1936. He did much work to expand CMS work into other areas of southern Sudan. He pushed hard for CMS to open work amongst the Zande, Bari and Moru tribes. In 1922 Shaw was made Archdeacon, and this was his identity as he was from then on always known as Archdeacon Shaw. He remained archdeacon until he retired in 1940.

Archdeacon Shaw never married, but he brought up many Dinka boys as his own sons. Abraham Chep Adongwei, one of his helpers who remembered Shaw after his death, for his love of Jieng (Dinka) community by bringing them together as true Christians and working for environmental change by planting trees. He retired in 1940 and went to live just outside Nairobi in Kenya. He died in 1956 and was buried in Langata Cemetery outside Nairobi.

Jon e Aruor, the first baptised Christian at Malek, said this about Shaw after he retired: “years ago, before the white men came, when the Dinka wished to send an important message, they chose the strongest and bravest warriors to go. And when you first brought the message of the gospel to us you sent your strongest and bravest warriors like Archdeacon Shaw and Bishop Gwynne.”
