= Nyakuron Cultural Centre =

Cultural centre located at Juda, South Sudan

- Company type: Government-owned corporation
- Founded: September 1976
- Headquarters: Juba, South Sudan
- Products: Publications in print and multimedia
- Services: cultural events, sports events, wedding functions
- Owner: Government of South Sudan
- Website: jubainthemaking.com/nyakuron-cultural-centre/

The Nyakuron Cultural Centre (or NCC) is a government owned and controlled corporation established to preserve, develop and promote cinema and culture in South Sudan.

== History ==
Nyakuron Centre was built after the 1972 Addis Ababa Agreement, which ended the First Sudanese Civil War. The center was officially opened in 1976 under the government led by Abel Alier.

The vast complex comprised with large gardens, an outdoor stage, an auditorium, a night club and a casino. Most of the local and international cultural festivals are held in the center, which includes; Hagana Peace Festival, The Juba Film Festival, the Kilkilu Ana Comedy show, international kickboxing competitions and art exhibitions. Besides, it is also rented out for private events such as weddings.
