= Baidit =

- Payam (administrative division)
- Etymology: 'big home' or 'big land'
- Country: South Sudan
- State: Jonglei State
- County: Bor West County (since 2016)
- Payam: Baidit
- Seat: Baidit

Baidit is a Payam in Bor West County, in Jonglei State, South Sudan. It is situated on the east side of the Bahr al Jabal River a short distance north of Bor, South Sudan. Baidit is the county headquarters for Bor West County.

Baidit Payam is the center for figures such as Gen. Kuol Manyang Juuk.

== Baidit Massacre ==
Around 4:00 P.M. on Sunday, 23 January 2022, at Baidit Payam, Bor County. Jonglei State, a group of organized gangs of criminals, heavily armed, suspected to be from neighboring Pibor Administrative Area, launched an attack in the area, killed and wounded innocent civilians, set homes on fire raided cattle, and marched Eastward. The State government and Jonglei Communities according to the letter, were and still are appalled by this shocking news this atrocious attack led to 32 innocent lives taken, 24 people wounded. 1 missing, 2,600 cattle raided, and a number of immovable properties destroyed or burnt.

== History ==
Baidit Payam is named for the village, Baidit (whose name is sometimes combined with an adjoining town, called Padak), where the payam's administrative headquarters are located. During the Second Sudanese Civil War (1983–2004), Baidit village was the site of a Sudan People's Liberation Army headquarters commanded by Kuol Manyang Juuk, which was located in buildings originally constructed by the Dutch Government to house a medical training center.

== Demographics ==
Baidit is composed of six bomas: Akayiech, Manydeng, Makol Cuei, Mathiang, Mayen, and Tong. (Note: Spellings of these bomas vary considerably, in large part owing to differences of orthographic conventions and, for place-names, specially, the way that Dinka singular nouns ending in a vowel or certain consonants, when followed by an adjective, pronoun, possessive, or a modifying noun (genitive), are pronounced with a nasalized final sound. Thus Mach Deng is pronounced /Manydeng/. A few common alternative spellings follow: Akayiech or Akeyech, Machdeng or Manydeng, Makol-chuei or Makol Cuei or Makolchuei, and Mathieng or Mathiang.) According to the Fifth Population and Housing Census of Sudan, conducted in April 2008, Baidit had a combined population of 51,532 people, composed of 26,915 male and 24,617 female residents. (Note: The data collected during the Fifth Population and Housing Census of Sudan were to be the primary source of information for decisions about the number and demarcation of electoral constituencies and administrative boundaries in what was then southern Sudan. South Sudanese officials rejected census results for southern Sudan. See Darfur Relief and Documentation Centre (2010). 5th Population and Housing Census in Sudan – An Incomplete Exercise (PDF) (Report). Darfur Relief and Documentation Centre, Geneva (Switzerland). Archived from the original (PDF) on 18 September 2017.. Also, see Demographics of South Sudan.)

Baidit is home to three major communities. These are Angakuei, Biong, Pathuyith.

Tong Boma is composed of Lith Akuok Machar as the largest section, followed by Hol (sometimes called Berjokngong), Deng Ajak, and Pen.

== Infrastructure ==
The Padak/Baidit airstrip is located in Baidit Payam. John Garang Memorial University's Padak Fisheries Training Centre was established there in 2004.
