= Akau Jambo =

South Sudanese comedian, actor and writer

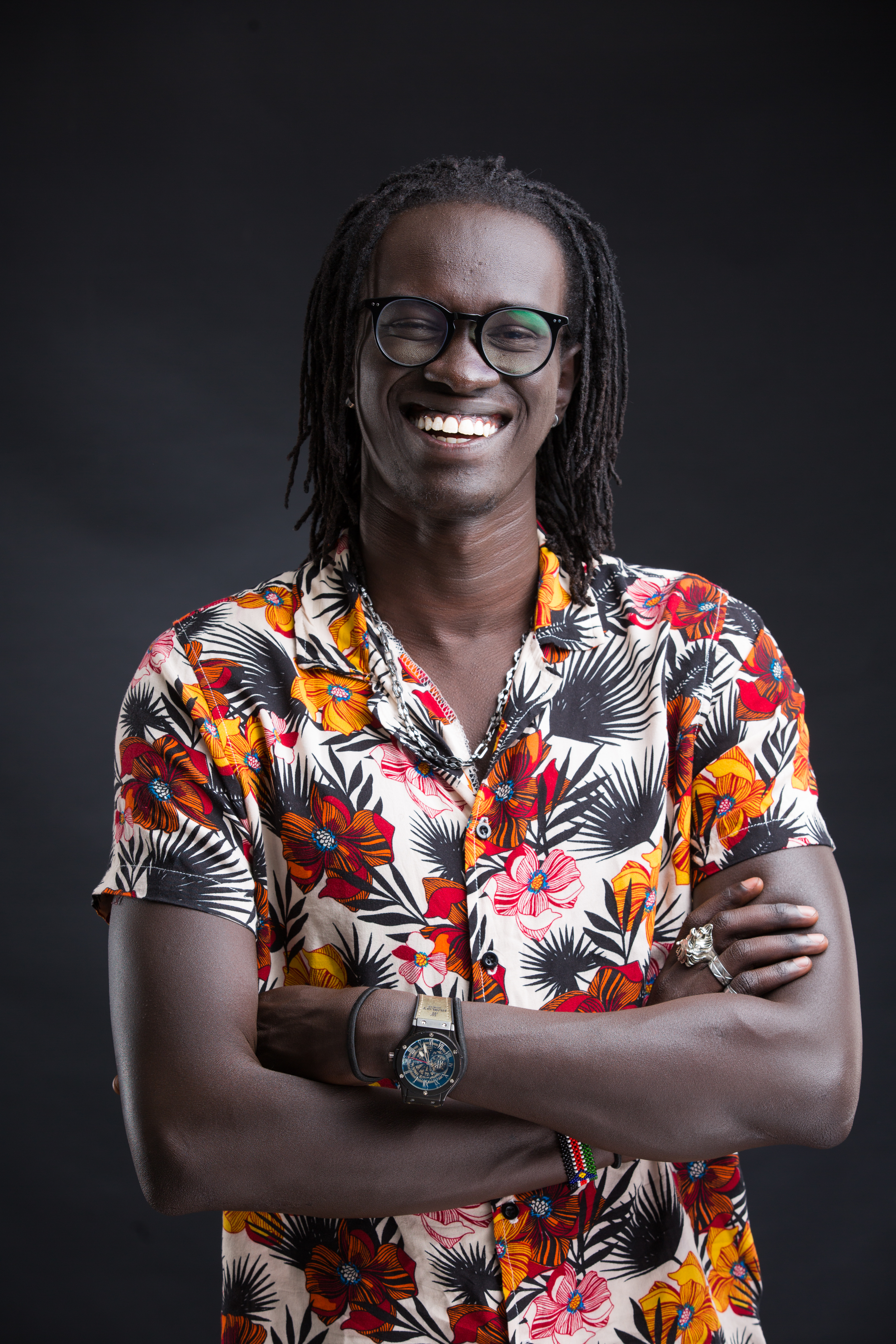
- Born: Akau Jambo Poundak; 7 March 1997 (age 29); Kakuma Refugee Camp; Turkana County, Kenya
- Education: Kampala International University
- Parents: Maj. Jambo Poundak Reec (father); Anai Malou Akau (mother)

Comedy career
- Years active: 2016–present
- Medium: Stand-up; film; television
- Genres: Observational comedy; political satire; surreal humor; black comedy
- Subjects: Social life; refugees; politics; economical life; religion; relationships; education
- Website: https://www.akaujambo.com/

Akau Jambo is a South Sudanese stand-up comedian, and actor. He is the founder of Juba International Comedy Festival the first comedy festival in South Sudan. Akau Jambo is also a Co-Founder of Creative Central; a creative agency and social enterprise that harnesses the power the creative industries to bring about social behaviour change to ignite the socio-economic transformation of South Sudan. Akau is also a Mandela Washington Fellow, 2022 cohort.

== Early life and education ==
Jambo was born on 7 March 1997 as Akau Jambo Poundak. He was born in Kakuma Refugee Camp, Turkana County in the northwestern part of Kenya. after his mother escaped the civil war in South Sudan. His father, Jambo Poundak Reec was a Major in the Sudan People's Liberation Army, A Dinka Agaar originating from Rumbek in Western Lakes State. His mother, Anai Malou Akau was a traditional craft designer hailing from Bor in Jonglei State

In 2001, Akau started his nursery school in Zimerman Primary School and later on Rhoisambo Primary School in Nairobi.In 2004 he started his primary school in Kampala. In 2009 he completed his Primary Leaving Examinations. Akau continued his studies to secondary school at Crane High School between 2010 and 2012. He then changed school to St. Janan Luwum in 2013 where he sat his 'O'Level exams. In 2017, he was admitted to Kampala International University where he graduated with a diploma in Information Technology in 2019.

== Career ==
In 2016, Akau had his comedy debut performance at Makerere University.

In 2018 in May, he was profiled in a Spanish Magazine, Mundo Negro, during a documentary on the lives of refugees living in Uganda. In June, Akau performed at the Kampala Comedy Festival. In October he was scheduled to perform at the Zed Laugh Festival in Zambia but did not make it.

In April 2019, Akau performed at the 7th HICOFEST at the Masa Square Hotel in Gaborone, Botswana. In August, he had his first one-man show in Juba

In early 2020 Akau, together with other comedians like Daliso Chaponda, Basketmouth and Eddie Kadi featured in an online comedy show under the LuQuLuQu campaign initiated by United Nations High Commissioner for Refugees called Africa is a Continent, African is a Country – Comedy with a Purpose. The campaign was to raise awareness on forced displacement in Africa.

However in November 2020, he returned to South Sudan after his international tour to Melbourne International Comedy Festival was called off due to the Covid-19 pandemic.

He was also partnered with ICAP a local NGO in South Sudan to carryout HIV/AIDS awareness in his hometown of Rumbek. The "Back to Treatment" was aimed at finding out why there was a high infection rate with low turn out on medication.

Akau then made one of his major performance in March 2022 at Johannesburg International Comedy Festival in a show dubbed "Comics without Borders", alongside some renowned African comedians.

In April 2022, Akau Jambo, founded the First Comedy Festival in South Sudan. As the host and Creative Director of Juba International Comedy Festival which happened on the 9th & 10 April 2022, the South Sudanese Comedian brought so much joy to the Residents of Juba as they got to experience two days filled with laughter alongside comedians from Uganda, Kenya, South Africa & South Sudan.

=== Genre of Comedy ===
Akau's comedy style is generally observational, blending Political satire, Surreal humour and Black comedy. Here, his subject matter, normally include social life, politics, economic life, Refugee life, religion and relationships

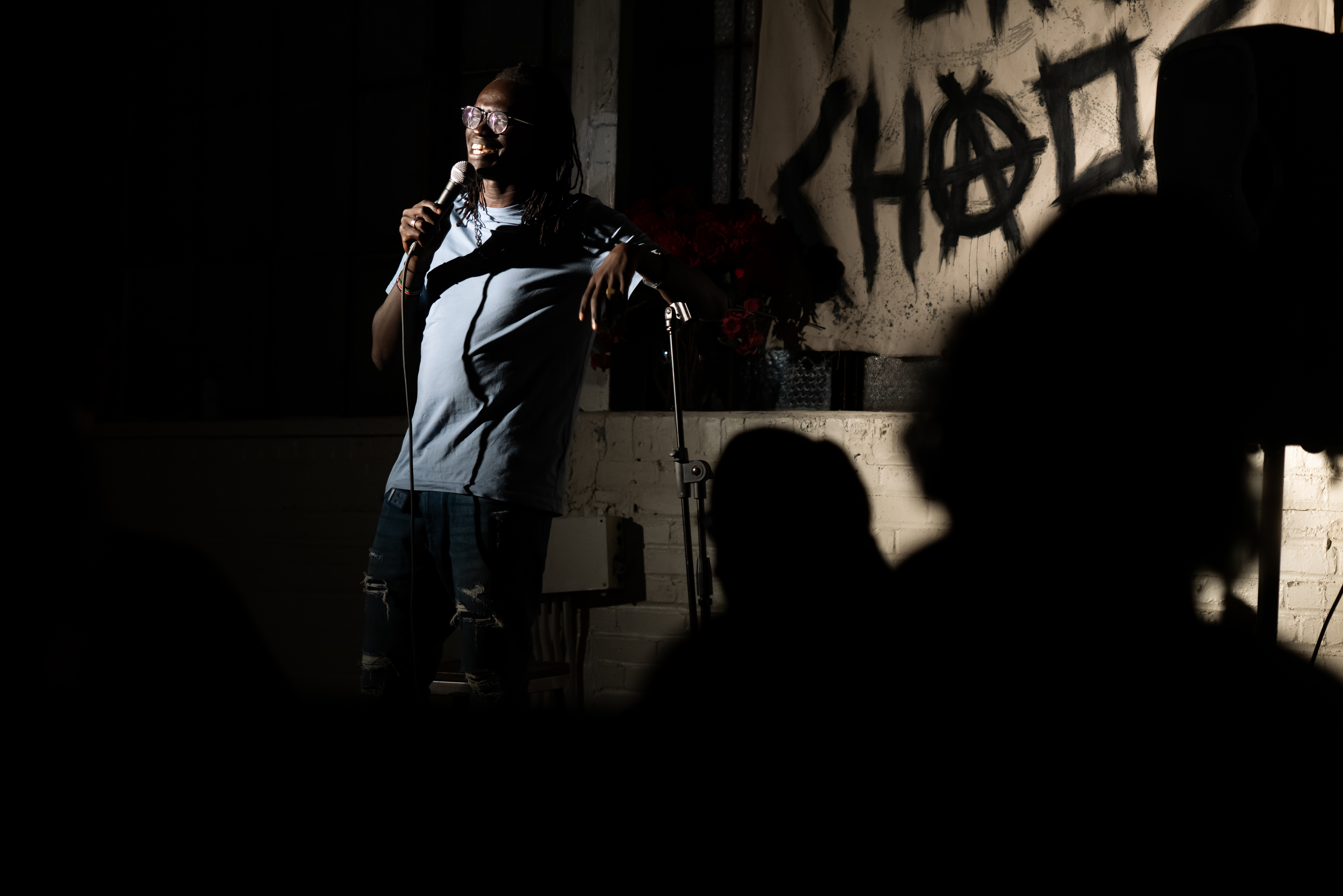
Akau Jambo performing at The Secret Show in New York, September 2022

== Activism ==
Akau is an active member of a refugee program in Uganda called Bear Burdens. He is also a member of Anataban Arts Initiative in South Sudan which uses various art forms to spread awareness on issues affecting the youth and society.

In March 2021, Akau, together with other activists were arrested after they staged a protest urging the government to ban water trucks which were recklessly driving in the streets of Juba. This was after a musician, Trisha Cee was knocked dead by a speeding truck.
