= Simon Makwac Mayen =

Sudanese politician (born 1922)

Simon Makwac Mayen (born 1922) was a Sudanese politician.

Simon was born in Nasir in 1922. He studied at the American Mission E.V. School in Nasir and the Nugent Church Missionary Society School in Loka. In 1948 he began teaching in the American Mission Schools.

In the 1953 Sudanese parliamentary election he was elected to the House of Representatives from the Pibor and Eastern Nuer constituency, standing as a National Unionist Party candidate. Whilst he had been elected as a NUP candidate, he announced his membership in the Liberal Party before the opening of the new parliament.
