= Mayen Ngor Atem =

South Sudanese politician

Brigadier General Mayen Ngor Atem is a South Sudanese politician. As of 2011, he was Minister of Agriculture in the Jonglei state government. He had also served as commissioner for Duk County.
