= Neveen Dominic =

South Sudanese actress and film producer in Nollywood, entrepreneur, Philanthropist

- Born: South Sudan
- Occupations: Actress, Film producer, Entrepreneur, Philanthropist

Neveen Dominic is a South Sudanese actress, film producer, entrepreneur and philanthropist based in Canada.

== Personal life ==
Dominic was born in South Sudan. Her father was a notable politician and her mum, an actress. She, then 15 years old alongside her family members, migrated to Calgary, Canada during the wartime in her country's history. In November 2019, she and her husband, a Nigerian also resident in Canada welcomed their first baby.

== Career ==
=== Entertainment industry ===
Dominic is the first of any South Sudanese actresses and film producers to feature in the Nigerian Nollywood. She produced and was starred in the TV series titled, "It’s A Crazy World," and was reported in March 2019 by The Eagle Online, of planning to return for the first of her TV series in Nigeria. On her return, she featured top Nollywood stars such as Bob-Manuel Udokwu, Amanda Ebeye, Grace Amah, Moyo Lawal, Francis Odega, Tunbosun Aiyedehin, and Tochi Ejike Asiegbu in her premier Nollywood TV series. She has been into filmmaking since about the year 1999.

She was the makeup artiste at the New York Fashion Week (NYFW) 2018, for the Jamaican-born New York designer, Glenroy March.

=== Entrepreneurship ===
She is the founder and CEO of Neveen Dominic Cosmetics, based in Calgary, Alberta, Canada, with manufacturing outlets in the United States and Germany. In April 2019, she announced the proposed rolling out of her brand of products in Nigeria and Ghana.

In her autobiography titled, "Beauty From The Ashes of War," she narrated her life journey as a South Sudanese refugee and stated that her cosmetic line's foremost purpose was women empowerment.

=== Philanthropy ===
During the COVID-19 lockdown, she came up with a plan to feed 5,000 Nigerians. Leadership News quoted her saying,

"...I have been to Nigeria for a project and immediately fell in love with the entrepreneurial drive of its young people, this is part of the reasons I decided to do a giveaway."
