= FilmAid =

U.S.-based non-profit organization

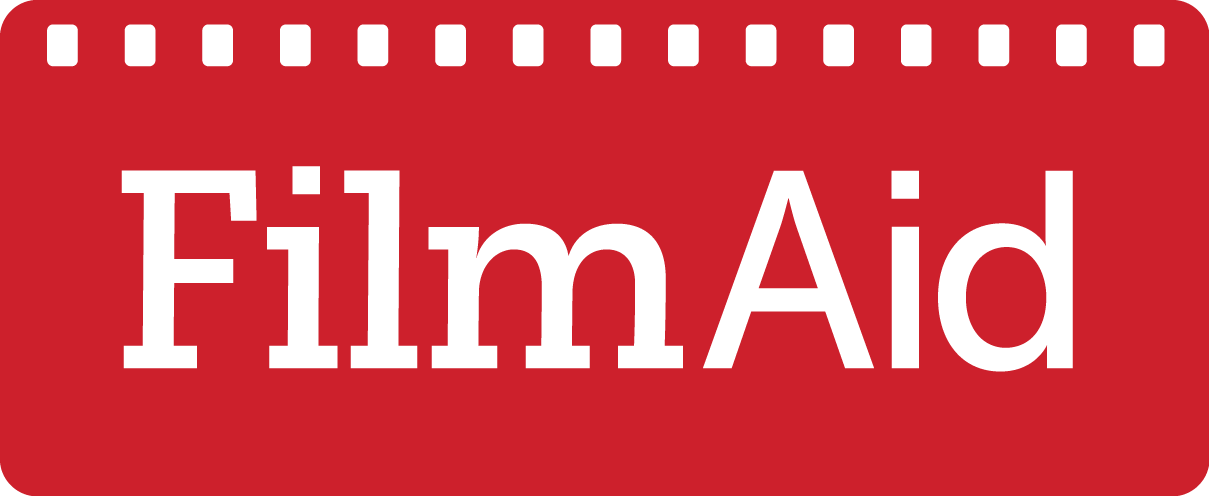
- Formation: 1999; 27 years ago
- Founder: Caroline Baron
- Type: NGO
- Headquarters: PO Box 4448, California, 95518, U.S
- Coordinates: 40.8699981°N 124.0975096°W
- Director: Gita Saedi Kiely
- Parent organization: Internews
- Revenue: ▲US$3.093 million (2016)
- Expenses: ▲US$2.911 million (2016)
- Website: filmaid.org

FilmAid is a non-profit humanitarian organization that uses film to educate and entertain displaced people around the world.

== History ==
FilmAid was founded during the Kosovo War in 1999 by producer Caroline Baron (Capote, Monsoon Wedding) to assist with refugee communities in Macedonia suffering the effects of war, poverty, displacement and disaster.
