= Bor County =

Bor County Bor
- Country: South Sudan
- Region: Greater Upper Nile
- State: Jonglei State
- Headquarters: Bor

Area
  - Total: 13,932 km^{2} (5,379 sq mi)

Population (2017 estimate)
  - Total: 305,328
  - Density: 21.916/km^{2} (56.761/sq mi)
- Time zone: UTC+2 (CAT)

Bor County is a county of Jonglei State in the Greater Upper Nile region of South Sudan.

== History ==
By 1906, Bor District was a part of Mongalla Province, but later transferred to Upper Nile Province. In 1909–1910, people started settling along the northern border of the Bor-Duk districts, with the aim of separating the Nuer and Dinka communities, who had formerly intermingled. It is bordered by Twic East and Duk counties to the north,Yirol East County and Awerial County of Lakes State to the west, Pibor to the east, Central and Eastern Equatoria States, to the south.

== Payams ==
A Payam is a mid-level administrative unit within counties that have a minimum population of 25,000 people.

In 2016 Bor County was sub-divided into Bor Payam and five separate counties, each containing a single payam. These division were Bor County (Kolnyang Payam), Bor East County (Anyidi Payam), Bor Central County (Makuach Payam), Bor West County (Baidit Payam), and Bor North County (Jalle Payam).

Bor County itself comprises five Payams, namely: Kolnyang, Anyidi, Makuach, Baidit and Jalle.
