= Bor, South Sudan =

City of Bor Mading Bor
- City
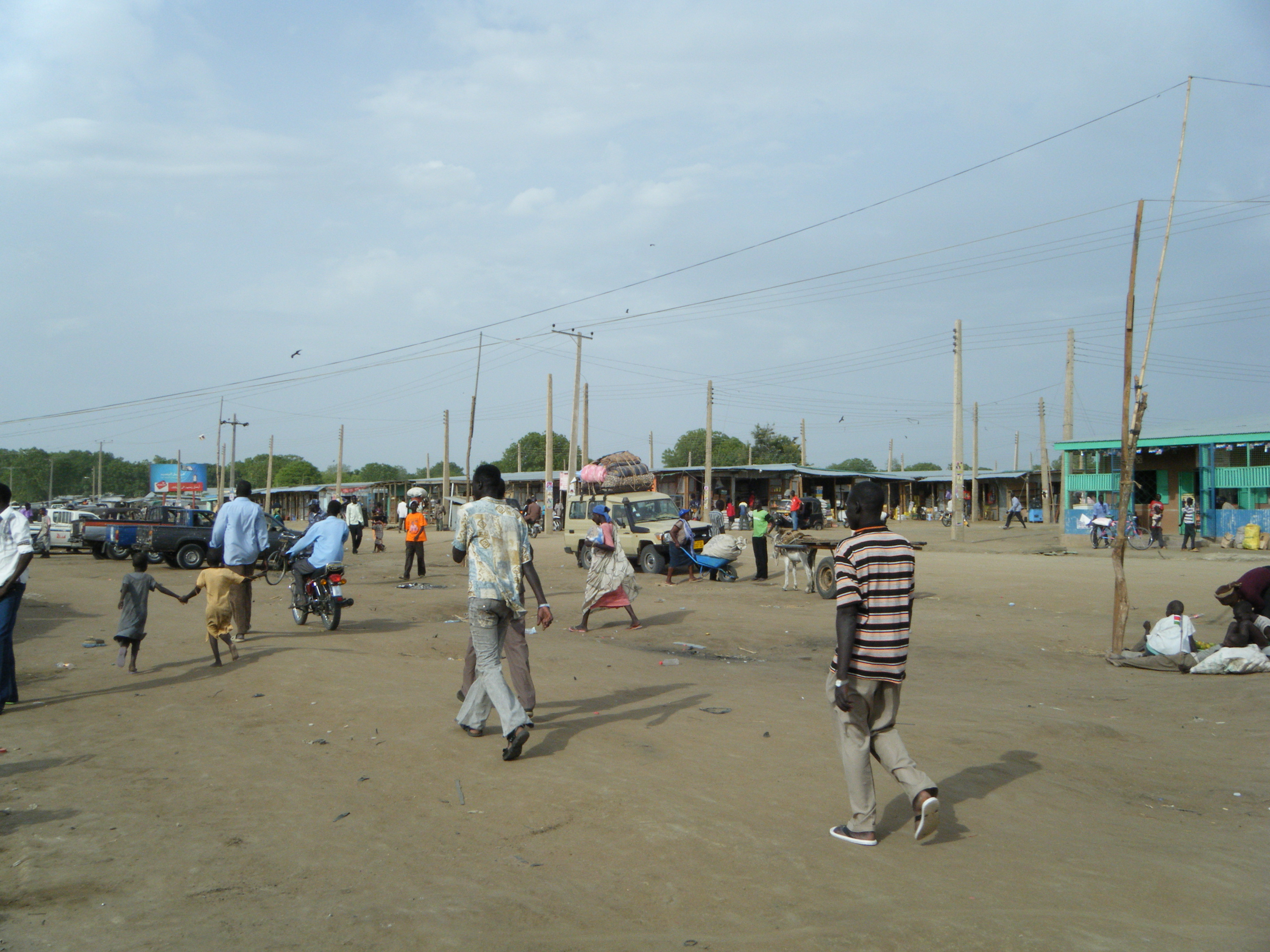
- Marol Market (also spelled "Maror Market") in Bor Town (2010).

- Location in South Sudan
- Coordinates: 6°12′45″N 31°33′39″E
- Country: South Sudan
- Region: Greater Upper Nile
- State: Jonglei State
- County: Bor County
- Elevation: 407 m (1,335 ft)

Population (2010)
  - Total: 315,351
- Time zone: UTC+2 (CAT)
- Climate: Aw

Bor is a historic city in the Bor region of Jonglei State, located in the central region of South Sudan. It has also served as the headquarters of Jonglei state. The city is situated on the east side of the White Nile (Bahr al Jabal River) at the southern extent of the sudd, South Sudan's vast central wetlands.

== History ==
Bor is located on the eastern bank of White Nile River, a site where an ivory trading depot was established in the 1860s. It grew into a regional hub of the ivory trade during the late nineteenth century. In 1874, Charles George Gordon established a government station there under the Turkiyah Government. In the early years of the Anglo-Egyptian Sudan, Bor was a "wooding station" for steamers travelling along the White Nile (Bahr al Jabal River). In 1905, Bor was established as the headquarters of the Bor District.

Bor became an administrative centre under the Anglo-Egyptian Sudan (1899–1956) for the Dinka Bor people. Bor is the epicenter of the Second Sudanese Civil War. 105 Battalion led by Alier Nhialmangardit staged a revolt against the oppressive Khartoum government in Malual-Chaat a garrison in Town of Bor, in May 1983, leading to the birth of the Sudan People's Liberation Movement and Sudan People's Liberation Army (SPLM/SPLA). Bor was also the scene of the 1991 Bor massacre, where thousands of civilians were killed by Riek Machar's army of loyal tribesmen. Eventually South Sudan became independent on 9 July 2011 following 22 years of liberation struggle.

Bor is of historical importance to the people of South Sudan. It was in Malek, a small settlement about 19 kilometres (12 mi) south of Bor, that one of the first modern Christian missions in present-day South Sudan was established by Archibald Shaw in 1906. Bor became the first area to host a Church Missionary Society station in 1906.

Malek was turned into a missionary stronghold in the Upper Nile Region. Shaw opened the first primary school in Malek. This school produced the first indigenous Anglican bishop to be consecrated in Dinkaland, the Right Rev. Daniel Deng Atong, followed the Nikonora Achiek Deng Ariir. Daniel Deng Atong became the first to be baptized in Bor.

Bor was an epicenter of the start of the Second Sudanese Civil War. In Malual-Chaat barrack, statues of liberators and destroyed weapons are conserved and exhibited at historical heritage site.

Following the 2013 South Sudanese coup d'état attempt, Bor was contested in several weeks of combat between the national army and rebels led by Riek Machar due to its influential status on national affairs. A portion of the Nuer White Army joined the fighting as well.

In 2016, Bor was designated as the seat of Bor Municipality. The same order sub-divided the former Bor County into five smaller counties, each containing a single payam. These new counties were Bor South County (Kolnyang payam), Bor East County (Anyidi Payam), Bor Central county (Makuach Payam), Bor West County (Baidit Payam), and Bor North County (Jalle Payam).

== Geography ==
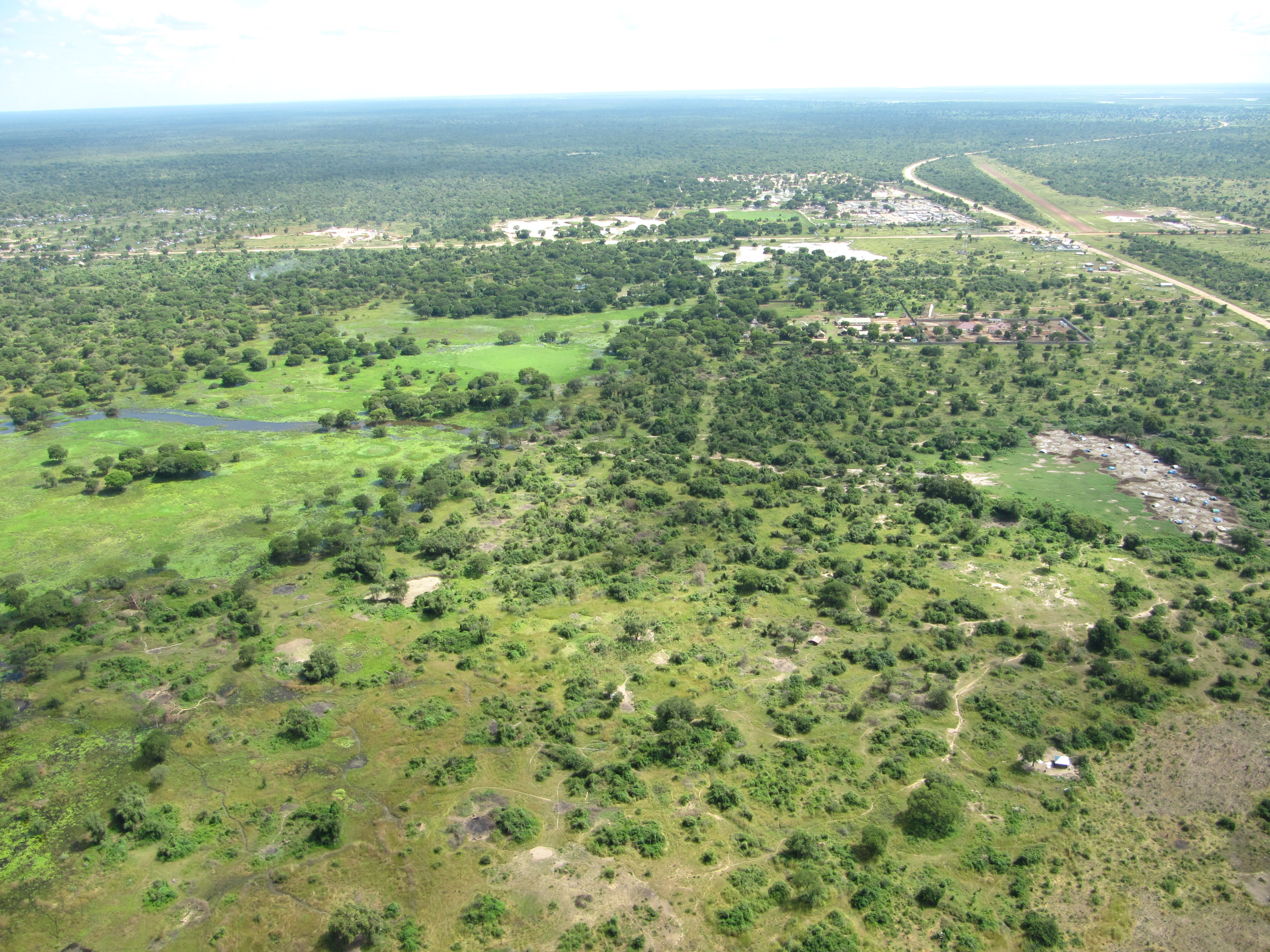
An aerial view of the extreme east edge of Bor (at the airport) looking South

Bor is the second most developed city, in central South Sudan, approximately 190 kilometres (120 mi), by road, north of Juba, the capital and largest city in the country. The town is located on the east bank of the White Nile.

== Climate ==
Köppen-Geiger climate classification system classifies its climate as tropical wet and dry (Aw).

Climate data for Bor, South Sudan
Month	Jan	Feb	Mar	Apr	May	Jun	Jul	Aug	Sep	Oct	Nov	Dec	Year
Mean daily maximum °C (°F)	36 (97)	36.6 (97.9)	36.6 (97.9)	34.9 (94.8)	33 (91)	31.8 (89.2)	30.3 (86.5)	30.5 (86.9)	31.5 (88.7)	33.1 (91.6)	34.4 (93.9)	35.1 (95.2)	33.7 (92.6)
Daily mean °C (°F)	27.9 (82.2)	28.6 (83.5)	29.6 (85.3)	28.6 (83.5)	27.4 (81.3)	26.6 (79.9)	25.5 (77.9)	25.5 (77.9)	26.2 (79.2)	27.2 (81.0)	27.6 (81.7)	27.3 (81.1)	27.3 (81.2)
Mean daily minimum °C (°F)	19.9 (67.8)	20.6 (69.1)	22.6 (72.7)	22.4 (72.3)	21.8 (71.2)	21.5 (70.7)	20.8 (69.4)	20.6 (69.1)	21 (70)	21.3 (70.3)	20.9 (69.6)	19.5 (67.1)	21.1 (69.9)
Average rainfall mm (inches)	2 (0.1)	5 (0.2)	32 (1.3)	80 (3.1)	119 (4.7)	112 (4.4)	126 (5.0)	150 (5.9)	124 (4.9)	105 (4.1)	32 (1.3)	4 (0.2)	891 (35.2)
Source: Climate-Data.org (altitude: 430m)

=== Climate Change In Bor ===
"The effects of climate change in South Sudan have led to unusually intense rains: flood waters have forced people from their homes, leaving them without sufficient food and water," says Caroline Sekyewa, IRC country director in South Sudan. Apr 10, 2023

== Population ==
The 2024 population of Bor is estimated by the United Nations agency's Statistics to be 727,583.

== Economy ==
The economy depends on agricultural products, fishing, livestock and foreign investments in different sectors. Bor has the highest number of livestock (cattle, goats and sheep) in the country. Bor is the second largest economy in the country, with Juba being the first as it is the centre of businesses and government. Prior to 2013 civil war, Bor was the fastest growing city in the country. Kenyan Commercial Bank (KCB) still maintains its branch.

== Education ==
Bor city has one of the best primary and secondary schools in the country. Both in primary and secondary national examinations, students and schools from Bor rank among the highest nationally. The John Garang Memorial University of Science and Technology, one of the leading public universities in the country, is located in Bor. The university is named after John Garang de Mabior a former leader of Sudan People Liberation Army/Movement (SPLA). Garang was a guerrilla leader fighting in Southern Sudan against Khartoum governments for what he termed as "New Sudan" under the SPLA/M umbrella. The Comprehensive Peace Agreement in 2005 was signed under his leadership, an event which paved way for the independence of South Sudan in July 2011 when Southern Sudan voted for separation from the North during the referendum.

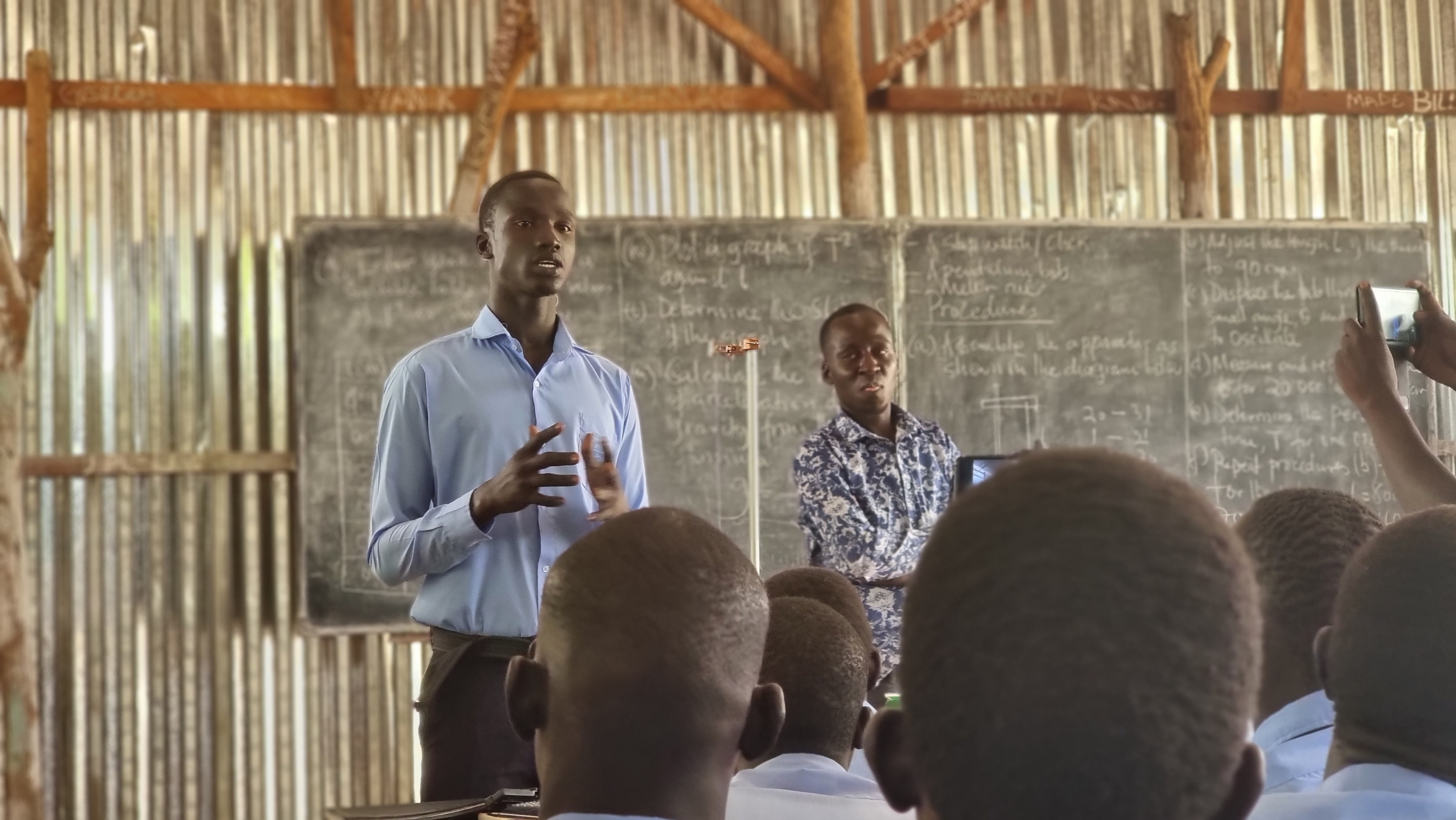
A teacher teaching in a secondary school in Bor

== Cathedral ==
Bor is also the seat of Bor Diocese in the Episcopal Church of Sudan.

== Transportation ==
Bor is also served by Bor Airport, in addition to river traffic on the White Nile and three major roads that lead out of town.

ARC collaborated with the government to build a multi-million dollar highway from Juba to Bor, the Juba–Bor Highway, making Bor the only city connected to national capital with a paved road. It is believed to be the longest dual carriage highway in the central and Eastern Africa.

== See also ==
- South Sudan
