= Boma (administrative division) =

A boma is a lowest-level administrative division, below payams, in South Sudan. Equivalent fifth-level divisions elsewhere are described as village, block or ward.

Bomas vary in size and typically contain many individual villages. In Bomas, authority is usually divided between the Boma administrators who are appointed by the government and the traditional chief appointed by a council of elders. As of 2009, South Sudan's 514 payams had an average of 4.2 bomas each.

== Etymology ==
The term Boma originated from the town of Boma in Jonglei State, the first place captured by the Sudan People's Liberation Army at the start of its 1983 insurgency.
