= Payam (administrative division) =

Administrative division in South Sudan

A payam is the second-lowest administrative division, below counties, in South Sudan. Payams are required to have a minimum population of 25,000. They are further subdivided into a variable number of bomas. As of 2017, South Sudan has 540 payams and 2500 bomas.

The unit of administration was introduced by the SPLM/A and formalized at the National Convention of New Sudan. The equivalent unit in neighboring Kenya and Uganda is sub-county.
