= Sam Soko =

Kenyan documentary filmmaker

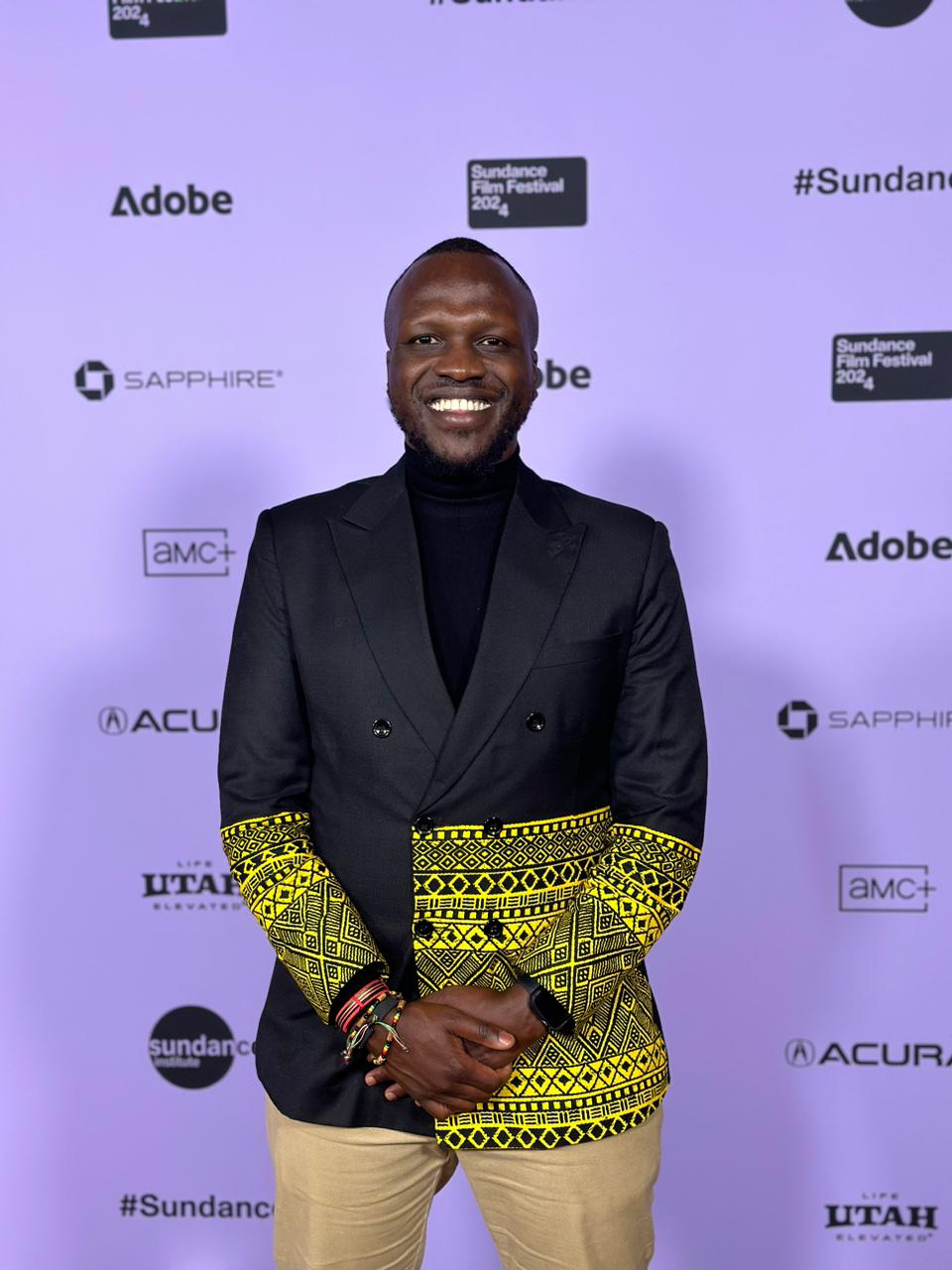
- Sam Soko in attendance at Sundance Film Festival 2024 for the World Premiere of 'The Battle For Laikipia'
- Born: 29 June 1985 (age 41); Kisii, Kenya
- Education: Maseno School; Moi University
- Occupation: Filmmaker
- Notable work: Softie (2020); No Simple Way Home (2022)

Sam Soko (born 29 June 1985) is a Kenyan documentary filmmaker, director, producer, editor, and co-founder of the Nairobi-based production company LBx Africa. His debut feature documentary Softie premiered at the 2020 Sundance Film Festival, where it won the World Cinema Documentary Special Jury Award for Editing.

He has also co-directed Free Money (2022) with Lauren DeFilippo and produced No Simple Way Home (2022)], directed by Akuol de Mabior and Matabeleland (2025), directed by Nyasha Kadandara.

His work has received nominations from the Emmy Awards (News and Documentary), Peabody Awards, and Producers Guild of America. In 2025, he was invited to join the Academy of Motion Picture Arts and Sciences Documentary Branch.

== Early life and education ==
Sam Soko was born and raised in Kisii, Kenya. He attended Maseno School for secondary education before enrolling at Moi University in Eldoret, where he studied Creative Arts with a focus on theatre and film.

Because the university lacked film production equipment at the time, he majored in theatre while continuing to explore storytelling through writing and directing plays.

Soko moved to Nairobi for his internship at Phoenix Players, a repertory theatre company. After completing his internship, he graduated from Moi University and later returned to Phoenix Players, which would become central to the start of his career.

== Career ==
Soko began his professional career in 2009 as a stage manager at Phoenix Players, where he worked until 2011. Alongside stage management, he wrote and directed original plays and adaptations, drawing inspiration from existential and absurdist writers such as Samuel Beckett, Harold Pinter, Albert Camus, and James Baldwin. These influences shaped his interest in deconstructing narrative structures as seen in his work as a Writer for the BBC 4 Radio Play, 'The New Bwana'. This approach also later informed his documentary practice, including Softie.

During his time at Phoenix, Soko was introduced to documentary filmmaking when a colleague invited him to assist with editing. He soon began scripting and editing nonprofit documentaries while immersing himself in the form by watching and reading extensively.

In October 2012, Soko co-founded the Nairobi-based production company LBx Africa with Bramwel Iro, Linda Wamalwa, and Brian Byaruhanga. Through the company, he worked across directing, producing, and editing roles on short films, documentaries, and creative projects before gaining international recognition with his debut feature documentary Softie (2020).

=== Softie (2020) ===
Soko directed and produced his debut feature documentary Softie, over seven years. The film follows Kenyan activist and photojournalist Boniface Mwangi's 2017 political campaign and the resulting tension between his activism and family life. Originally conceived in 2013 as a series of short activist training videos, the project expanded into a feature-length documentary as Mwangi's campaign progressed. In 2017, Soko received the Hot Docs–Blue Ice Group Documentary Fund, providing the mentorship and funding necessary to complete the film.

Building on years of shared protest experiences, Soko gained intimate access to the Mwangi family, eventually interweaving their private domestic scenes with public political life. Due to safety concerns, the team utilized discreet production methods and finalized editing in Canada. Critics praised the film's dual focus; Variety described it as both a "riveting: political journey and a "moving marriage story," while the Financial Times noted its strong emphasis on family dynamics.

=== No Simple Way Home (2022) ===
Soko produced No Simple Way Home, a feature-length documentary directed by Akuol de Mabior. The film follows de Mabior, her sister, and their mother Rebecca Nyandeng de Mabior (widow of independence leader John Garang) as they return to South Sudan during a fragile peace process. The project began in late 2018 after de Mabior pitched the concept to Soko following her university studies.

Throughout production, de Mabior described Soko as a vital "filmmaking confidante," who provided consistent support for the narrative. The film featured a predominantly female African crew and received backing from several organizations including The Whickers, Doc Society, Docubox, the IDFA Bertha Fund, Documentary Africa, and STEPS as part of the Generation Africa anthology. The documentary premiered in the Panorama section of the 2022 at the Berlin International Film Festival. with de Mabior later highlighting Soko's integral role in the film's development.

=== Free Money (2022) ===
Soko co-directed Free Money with Lauren DeFilippo documenting a universal basic income (UBI) experiment by the U.S. nonprofit GiveDirectly in the Kenyan village of Kogutu. Soko complimented the film's perspective, with both directors expressing initial skepticism toward the program's long-term impact. Their collaboration placed emphasis on portraying residents with dignity rather than as economic data points, while noting that cash transfers do not necessaritly resolve underlying structural poverty. The film premiered at Toronto International Film Festival and received critical praise for its balanced, "absorbing" approach The documentary is currently available to stream on Netflix Africa.

Soko and DeFilippo have since continued their collaboration on several projects, including the short documentary 'One Last Order' which won the Audience Award at the 2026 Aspen ShortFest. They are also in development for the documentary series 'Dark Horse' which was selected for the 2026 CPH:DOX Forum.

=== The Battle For Laikipia (2024) ===
Soko served as editor on The Battle for Laikipia, a feature-length documentary directed by Daphne Matziaraki and Peter Murimi. The film explores historical injustices and climate pressures in Kenya's Laikipia region, focusing on the conflict between indigenous Samburu pastoralists and white landowners.

Developed over seven years, Soko shaped the narrative from over 300 hours of footage to create a balance between the competing perspectives. Nation Africa noted the film's ability to highlight the "human heart" of a conflict often simplified in news headlines.

During the two-year editing process, Soko utilized remote collaboration and transcription tools to manage vast amounts of multilingual footage, ensuring the dignity of the subjects was maintained.

Critics praised the film's editorial structure; The Guardian described it as "visually striking and carefully edited" while Film Review Daily highlighted its "haunting" portrayal of colonial legacies and drought. The film premiered at the 2024 Sundance Film Festival with reviewers noting that Soko's editing avoided creating "obvious villains", instead encouraging viewers to understand the systemic roots of the dispute.

=== Matabeleland (2025) ===
Soko produced Matabeleland, the debut feature documentary of Zimbabwean filmmaker Nyasha Kadandara.

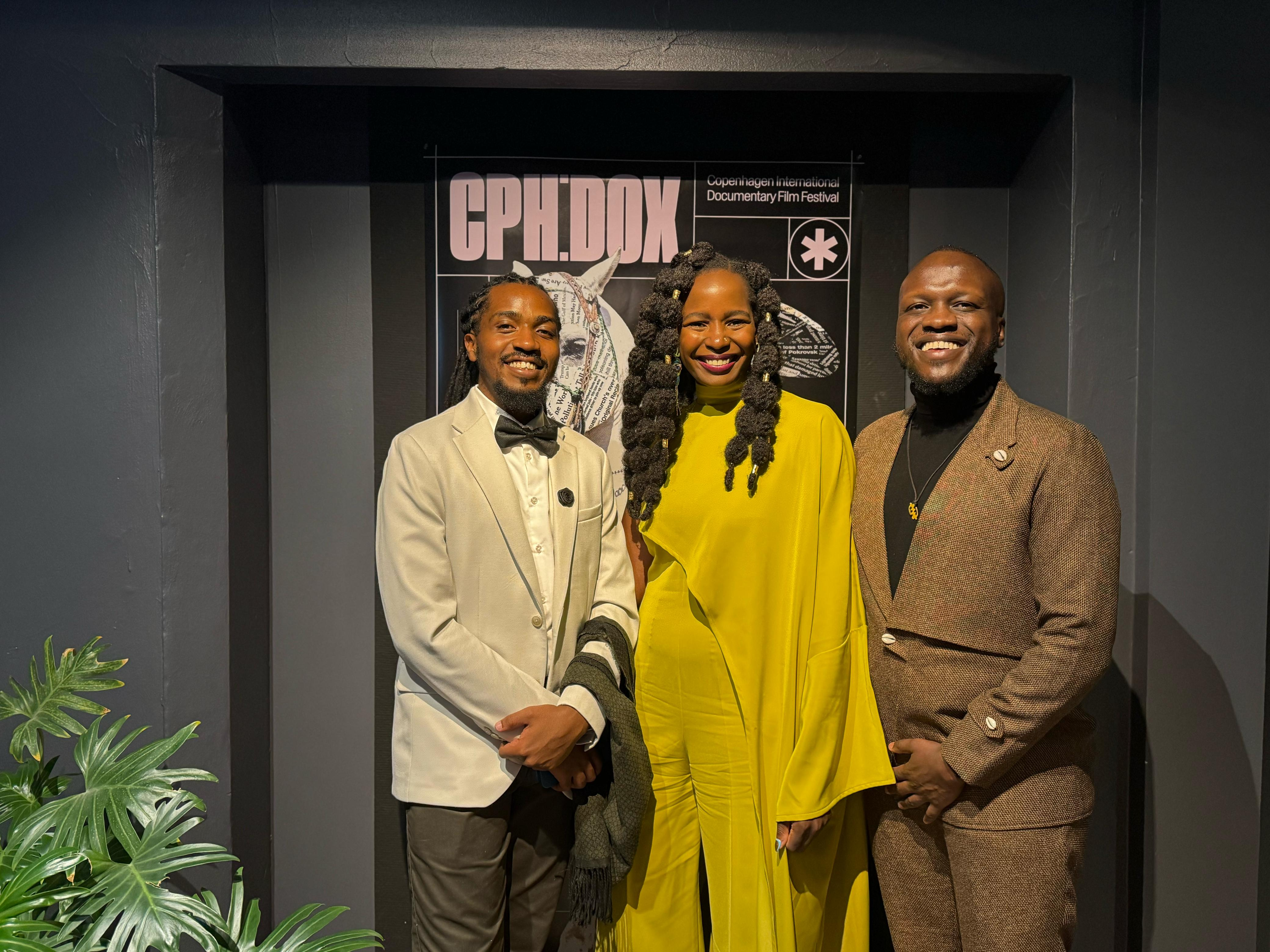
L - R Matabeleland Editor, Jordan Inaan, Director, Nyasha Kadandara and Producer, Sam Soko at the film's World Premiere at CPH:DOX 2025

The film follows a Zimbabwean immigrant in Botswana seeking to resolve his family's trauma linked to the Gukurahundi massacres of the 1980s. Initially a short film, Soko encouraged Kadandara to expand the project into a feature, a collaborative process that spanned seven years.

For Soko, the project aligned with his goal of supporting first time filmmakers from the Global South and fostering "South-South exchange" in documentary filmmaking.

Critics and audiences have noted the film's rare portrayal of African masculinity and its exploration of intergenerational silence. Sinema Focus described the documentary as a work that "carries the past, confronts the present and cradles the future"

Matabeleland premiered at CPH:DOX in 2025 before screening at other international festivals like Encounters South African International Documentary Festival.

== Filmography ==
Year	Title	Role	Format
2026	One Last Order	Co-Director/Producer	Short Documentary
2025	Matabeleland	Producer	Feature Documentary
2025	Victoria	Director/Writer	Short Documentary
2024	Sickle Cell: The Enemy Within	Producer	Short Documentary
2024	Aloe Blacc - Don't Go Alone	Director	Music Video
2024	Stero	Executive Producer	Short Fiction
2023	What Is Eating My Mind	Producer	Mid-Length Documentary
2022	No Simple Way Home	Producer	Feature Documentary
2022	Free Money	Co-Director/Producer	Feature Documentary
2022	Baba	Executive Producer	Short Fiction
2020	Softie	Director/Producer	Feature Documentary
