= Toni Kamau =

Kenyan documentary producer and writer

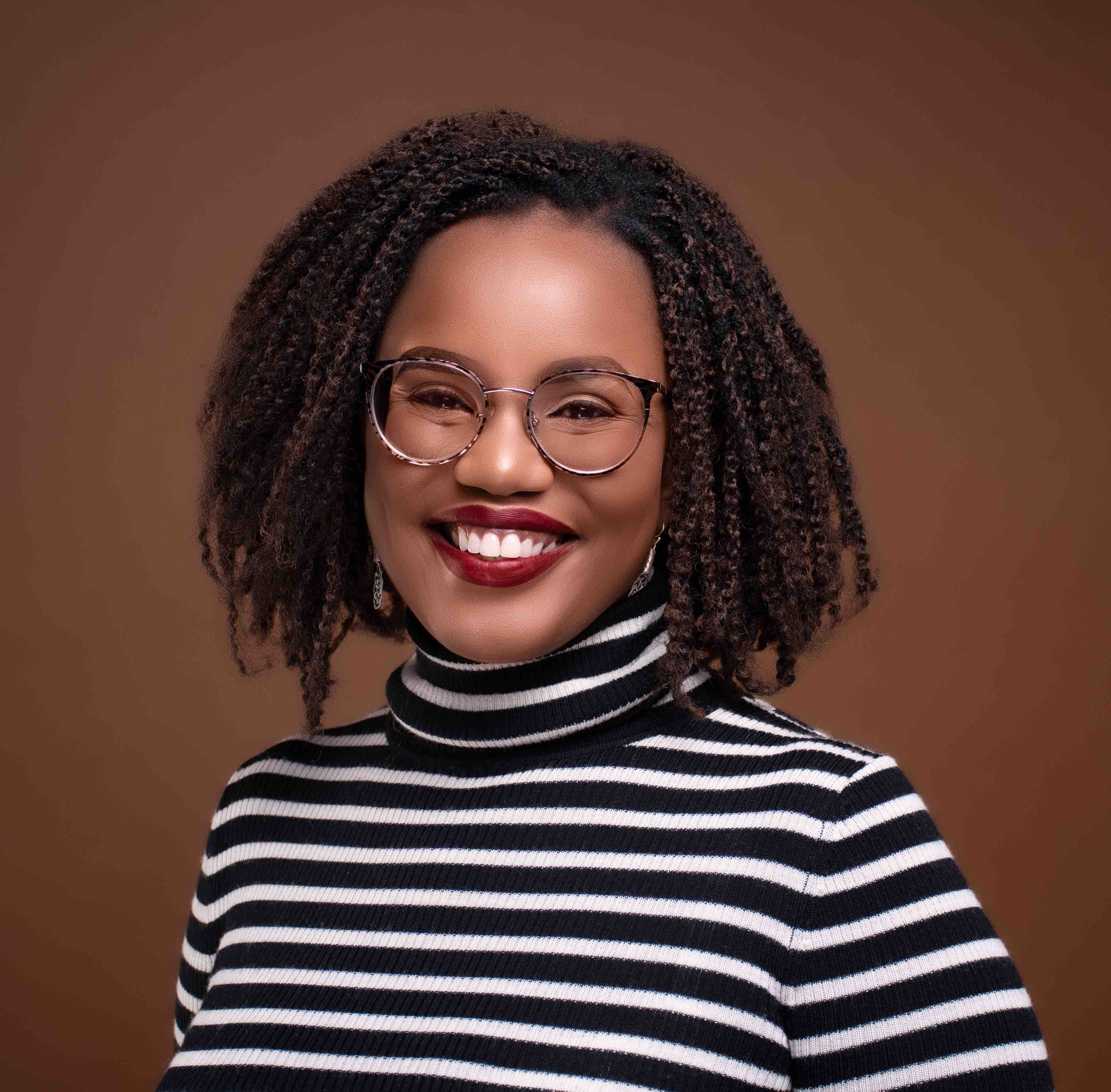
- Born: 1980s Kenya
- Education: University of Nairobi
- Occupations: Documentary producer; Consulting producer; Fiction writer
- Years active: 2009–present
- Organizations: We are not the Machine; On Screen Productions Ltd; Mohamed Amin Foundation
- Notable work: Softie; I Am Samuel; The Battle for Laikipia
- Awards: Sundance Amazon MGM Nonfiction Producer Prize; Women in Film Awards Kenya (2021, 2026); Silver Baton duPont Award (2022)

Toni Kamau (born 1980s) is a Kenyan documentary producer and fiction writer. She is known for producing the feature documentaries Softie, I Am Samuel and The Battle for Laikipia. Her work has been showcased at international film festivals, including the Sundance Film Festival. In 2024, she received the Sundance Amazon MGM Studios Nonfiction Producer Award for The Battle for Laikipia.

Kamau is a member of the documentary branch of the Academy of Motion Picture Arts and Sciences, as well as the Producers Guild of America and the Producers Guild of Kenya. She also serves on the board of the International Documentary Association.

== Early life and education ==
Kamau was born and raised in Kenya. She has described her early exposure to media as limited, with access primarily to international programming such as BBC News, CNN, Cheers, and Monty Python. This early experience influenced her perspective on storytelling, driving her focus toward producing narratives that accurately reflect African societies, identities, and lived experiences.

== Career ==
Kamau began her career in television production as a series producer for Hatua, a human rights-focused talk show supported by the Open Society Initiative.

She later co-founded On Screen Productions Ltd alongside Wanzilu Mangi and Christine Kinyanjui. The company operated between 2009 and 2018 and produced content for clients including Safaricom and the M-Pesa Foundation. It also provided production services for international media and fashion projects, including the 2016 Vogue cover shoot featuring Lupita Nyong’o. During her time with On Screen Productions, Kamau also directed and produced factual television content, including the documentary short Silicon Savannah for the BBC and TVE.

In 2017, Kamau founded the production company We Are Not the Machine, a Kenya-based company focused on storytelling about African communities and global social issues. Through the company, she has collaborated with international organizations and media outlets. Her commissioned and service-produced documentary content has aired on major international networks, including Al Jazeera, MTV Europe, Bloomberg, Voice of America, BBC Africa, and ARTE Digital.

Her independent feature producing credits include several internationally recognized documentaries. Softie, directed by Sam Soko, followed the political campaign of Kenyan activist Boniface Mwangi and premiered at the Sundance Film Festival, where it won the World Cinema Documentary Special Jury Award. I Am Samuel, directed by Peter Murimi, premiered at Hot Docs. In 2024, The Battle for Laikipia, an exploration of land conflicts in Kenya co-directed by Daphne Matziaraki and Peter Murimi, premiered at Sundance and received international critical attention.

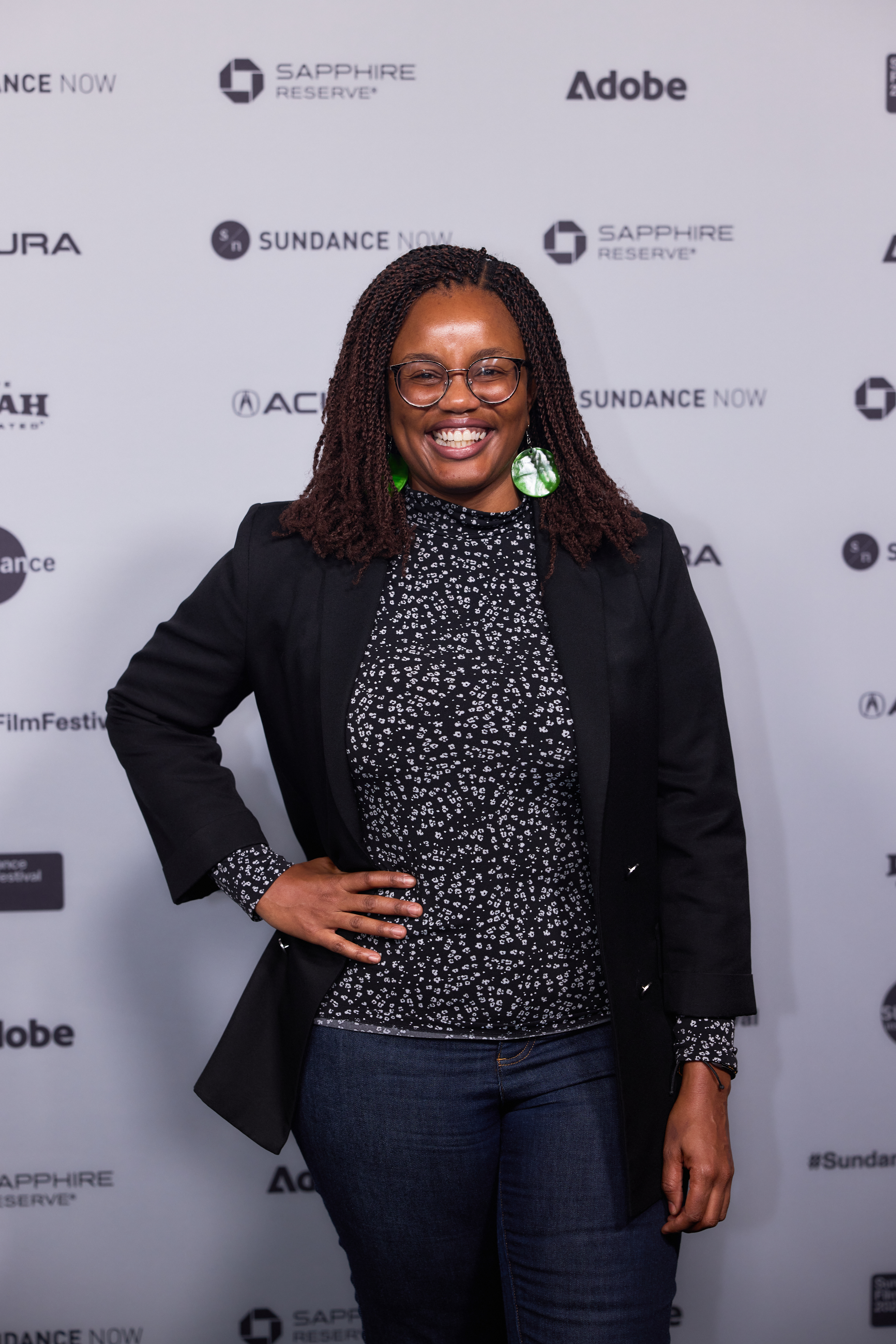
Toni Kamau, 2026 Sundance Film Festival World Documentary

In recognition of her work, Kamau has been nominated for Peabody and News Emmy Awards. In 2020, she was invited to join the documentary branch of the Academy of Motion Picture Arts and Sciences, becoming the youngest female African documentary producer to be admitted to the branch at the time. Her influence in the global film community was further recognized in January 2026 when she was appointed as a juror for the Sundance Film Festival.

In addition to documentary work, Kamau has been involved in the development of fiction and episodic projects, including Money Town and Tithes and Offerings.

== Filmography ==
=== Film and television ===
Year	Title	Role	Notes
2025–present	Tithes and Offerings	Producer	Feature film (in development)
2025–present	Money Town	Producer	Series (in development)
2025–present	Constant Bloom	Producer	Feature film (in development)
2024	The Battle for Laikipia	Producer	Documentary feature
2018	Earn a Living	Producer, writer	Interactive documentary series
2020	I Am Samuel	Producer	Documentary feature
—	Hatua	Series producer	Television talk show
2006	Kibera Kid	Production assistant	Short film
2020	Softie	Producer	Documentary feature

== Awards and nominations ==
Year	Award	Category	Work	Result	Ref
2026	Women in Film Awards Kenya	Best Documentary Producer	The Battle for Laikipia	Won	
2024	Sundance Institute	Amazon MGM Nonfiction Producer Prize	The Battle for Laikipia	Won	
2022	duPont-Columbia Awards	Silver Baton	Softie	Won	
2021	Women in Film Awards Kenya	Best Documentary Producer	The Battle for Laikipia	Won	
2021	PGA Awards	Outstanding Producer of Documentary Motion Pictures	Softie	Nominated	
2021	International Documentary Association	Best Feature	Softie	Nominated	
2021	African Movie Academy Awards	Best Documentary	Softie	Won	
