= 2020 Sundance Film Festival =

Film festival

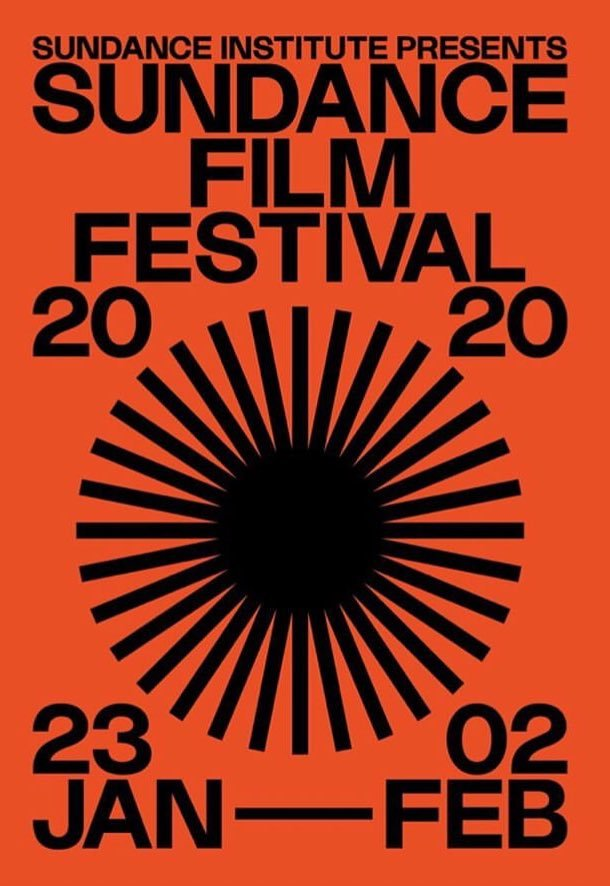
- Festival poster
- Location: Park City, Salt Lake City, Ogden, and Sundance, Utah
- Hosted by: Sundance Institute
- Festival date: January 23 to February 2, 2020
- Language: English
- Website: sundance.org/festival
- 2021 Sundance Film Festival 2019 Sundance Film Festival

The 2020 Sundance Film Festival took place from January 23 to February 2, 2020. The first lineup of competition films was announced on December 4, 2019. The opening night film was Miss Americana directed by Lana Wilson and produced by Morgan Neville, Caitrin Rogers, and Christine O'Malley.

== Films ==
=== U.S. Dramatic Competition ===
- The 40-Year-Old Version by Radha Blank
- Blast Beat by Esteban Arango
- Charm City Kings by Ángel Manuel Soto
- Dinner in America by Adam Carter Rehmeier
- The Evening Hour by Braden King
- Farewell Amor by Ekwa Msangi
- Minari by Lee Isaac Chung
- Miss Juneteenth by Channing Godfrey Peoples
- Never Rarely Sometimes Always by Eliza Hittman
- Nine Days by Edson Oda
- Palm Springs by Max Barbakow
- Save Yourselves! by Alex Huston Fischer and Eleanor Wilson
- Shirley by Josephine Decker
- Sylvie's Love by Eugene Ashe
- Wander Darkly by Tara Miele
- Zola by Janicza Bravo

=== U.S. Documentary Competition ===
- Be Water by Bao Nguyen
- Bloody Nose, Empty Pockets by Bill and Turner Ross
- Boys State by Jesse Moss and Amanda McBaine
- Coded Bias by Shalini Kantayya
- The Cost of Silence by Mark Manning
- Crip Camp by Jim LeBrecht and Nicole Newnham
- Dick Johnson Is Dead by Kirsten Johnson
- Feels Good Man by Arthur Jones
- The Fight by Eli Despres, Josh Kriegman and Elyse Steinberg
- Mucho Mucho Amor by Cristina Costantini and Kareem Tabsch
- Spaceship Earth by Matt Wolf
- A Thousand Cuts by Ramona S. Diaz
- Time by Garrett Bradley
- Us Kids by Kim A. Snyder
- Welcome to Chechnya by David France
- Whirlybird by Matt Yoka

=== Premieres ===
- The Courier by Dominic Cooke (previously titled "Ironbark")
- Downhill by Nat Faxon and Jim Rash
- Dream Horse by Euros Lyn
- Falling by Viggo Mortensen
- The Father by Florian Zeller
- Four Good Days by Rodrigo García
- The Glorias by Julie Taymor
- Herself by Phyllida Lloyd
- Horse Girl by Jeff Baena
- Kajillionaire by Miranda July
- The Last Shift by Andrew Cohn
- The Last Thing He Wanted by Dee Rees
- Lost Girls by Liz Garbus
- The Nest by Sean Durkin
- Promising Young Woman by Emerald Fennell
- Sergio by Greg Barker
- Tesla by Michael Almereyda
- Uncle Frank by Alan Ball
- Untitled Pizza Movie by David Shapiro
- Wendy by Benh Zeitlin
- Worth by Sara Colangelo

=== Documentary Premieres ===
- Aggie by Catherine Gund
- Assassins by Ryan White
- Disclosure: Trans Lives on Screen by Sam Feder
- The Dissident by Bryan Fogel
- Giving Voice by James D. Stern
- The Go-Go's by Alison Ellwood
- Happy Happy Joy Joy: The Ren and Stimpy Story by Ron Cicero and Kimo Easterwood
- Natalie Wood: What Remains Behind by Laurent Bouzereau
- Okavango: River of Dreams (Director's Cut) by Dereck Joubert and Beverly Joubert
- Rebuilding Paradise by Ron Howard
- Miss Americana by Lana Wilson
- On the Record by Kirby Dick and Amy Ziering
- The Social Dilemma by Jeff Orlowski
- Vivos by Ai Weiwei

=== World Cinema Dramatic Competition ===
- Charter by Amanda Kernell
- Cuties by Maïmouna Doucouré
- Exile by Visar Morina
- High Tide by Verónica Chen
- Identifying Features by Fernanda Valadez
- Jumbo by Zoé Wittock
- Luxor by Zeina Durra
- Possessor by Brandon Cronenberg
- Summer White by Rodrigo Ruiz Patterson
- Surge by Aneil Karia
- This Is Not a Burial, It's a Resurrection by Lemohang Jeremiah Mosese
- Yalda, a Night for Forgiveness by Massoud Bakhshi

=== World Cinema Documentary Competition ===
- Acasă, My Home by Radu Ciorniciuc
- The Earth Is Blue as an Orange by Iryna Tsilyk
- Epicentro by Hubert Sauper
- Influence by Diana Neille and Richard Poplak
- Into the Deep by Emma Sullivan
- The Mole Agent by Maite Alberdi
- Once Upon a Time in Venezuela by Anabel Rodríguez Ríos
- The Painter and the Thief by Benjamin Ree
- The Reason I Jump by Jerry Rothwell
- Saudi Runaway by Susanne Regina Meures
- Softie by Sam Soko
- The Truffle Hunters by Michael Dweck and Gregory Kershaw

=== NEXT ===
- Beast Beast by Danny Madden
- Black Bear by Lawrence Michael Levine
- I Carry You With Me by Heidi Ewing
- The Killing of Two Lovers by Robert Machoian
- La Leyenda Negra by Patricia Vidal Delgado
- The Mountains Are a Dream That Call to Me by Cedric Cheung-Lau
- Omniboat: A Fast Boat Fantasia by The Daniels, Hannah Fidell, Alexa Lim Haas, Lucas Leyva, Olivia Lloyd, Jillian Mayer, The Meza Brothers, Terence Nance, Brett Potter, Dylan Redford, Xander Robin, Julian Yuri Rodriguez, Celia Rowlson-Hall
- Some Kind of Heaven by Lance Oppenheim
- Spree by Eugene Kotlyarenko
- Summertime by Carlos López Estrada

=== Midnight ===
- Amulet by Romola Garai
- Bad Hair by Justin Simien
- His House by Remi Weekes
- Impetigore by Joko Anwar
- Relic by Natalie Erika James
- Run Sweetheart Run by Shana Feste
- Scare Me by Josh Ruben
- The Night House by David Bruckner
- The Nowhere Inn by Bill Benz

=== Spotlight ===
- And Then We Danced by Levan Akin
- Collective by Alexander Nanau
- Ema by Pablo Larraín
- La Llorona by Jayro Bustamante
- The Assistant by Kitty Green
- The Climb by Michael Angelo Covino
- The Perfect Candidate by Haifaa al-Mansour

=== Kids ===
- Binti by Frederike Migom
- Come Away by Brenda Chapman
- Timmy Failure: Mistakes Were Made by Tom McCarthy

== Awards ==
The following awards were given out:

=== Grand Jury Prizes ===
- U.S. Dramatic Competition – Minari (Lee Isaac Chung)
- U.S. Documentary Competition – Boys State (Jesse Moss)
- World Cinema Dramatic Competition – Yalda, a Night for Forgiveness (Massoud Bakhshi)
- World Cinema Documentary Competition – Epicentro (Hubert Sauper)

=== Audience Awards ===
- U.S. Dramatic Competition – Minari (Lee Isaac Chung)
- U.S. Documentary Competition – Crip Camp (Jim LeBrecht and Nicole Newnham)
- World Cinema Dramatic Competition – Identifying Features (Fernanda Valadez)
- World Cinema Documentary Competition – The Reason I Jump (Jerry Rothwell)
- NEXT – I Carry You With Me (Heidi Ewing)

=== Directing ===
- U.S. Dramatic Competition – Radha Blank for The 40-Year-Old Version
- U.S. Documentary Competition – Garrett Bradley for Time
- World Cinema Dramatic Competition – Maïmouna Doucouré for Cuties
- World Cinema Documentary Competition – Iryna Tsilyk for The Earth Is Blue as an Orange
- Waldo Salt Screenwriting Award – Edson Oda for Nine Days
- NEXT Innovator Prize – Heidi Ewing for I Carry You With Me

=== Special Jury Prizes ===
- U.S. Dramatic Special Jury Award for Ensemble Cast – The cast of Charm City Kings
- U.S. Dramatic Special Jury Award: Auteur Filmmaking – Josephine Decker for Shirley
- U.S. Dramatic Special Jury Award: Neo-Realism – Eliza Hittman for Never Rarely Sometimes Always
- U.S. Documentary Special Jury Award for Editing – Tyler H. Walk for Welcome to Chechnya
- U.S. Documentary Special Jury Award for Innovation in Non-fiction Storytelling – Kirsten Johnson for Dick Johnson Is Dead
- U.S. Documentary Special Jury Award for Emerging Filmmaker – Arthur Jones for Feels Good Man
- U.S. Documentary Special Jury Award for Social Impact Filmmaking – Eli Despres, Josh Kriegman and Elyse Steinberg for The Fight
- World Cinema Dramatic Special Jury Award for Acting – Ben Whishaw for Surge
- World Cinema Dramatic Special Jury Award for Visionary Filmmaking – Lemohang Jeremiah Mosese for This Is Not a Burial, It's a Resurrection
- World Cinema Dramatic Special Jury Award for Best Screenplay – Astrid Rondero and Fernanda Valadez for Identifying Features
- World Cinema Documentary Special Jury Award for Creative Storytelling – Benjamin Ree for The Painter and the Thief
- World Cinema Documentary Special Jury Award for Cinematography – Radu Ciorniciuc and Mircea Topoleanu for Acasă, My Home
- World Cinema Documentary Special Jury Award for Editing – Mila Aung-Thwin, Ryan Mullins and Sam Soko for Softie
- Alfred P. Sloan Award – Tesla (Michael Almereyda)
- Gayle Stevens Volunteer Award – Devon Edwards
