= Stevan Lee Mraovitch =

American film director, producer and screenwriter

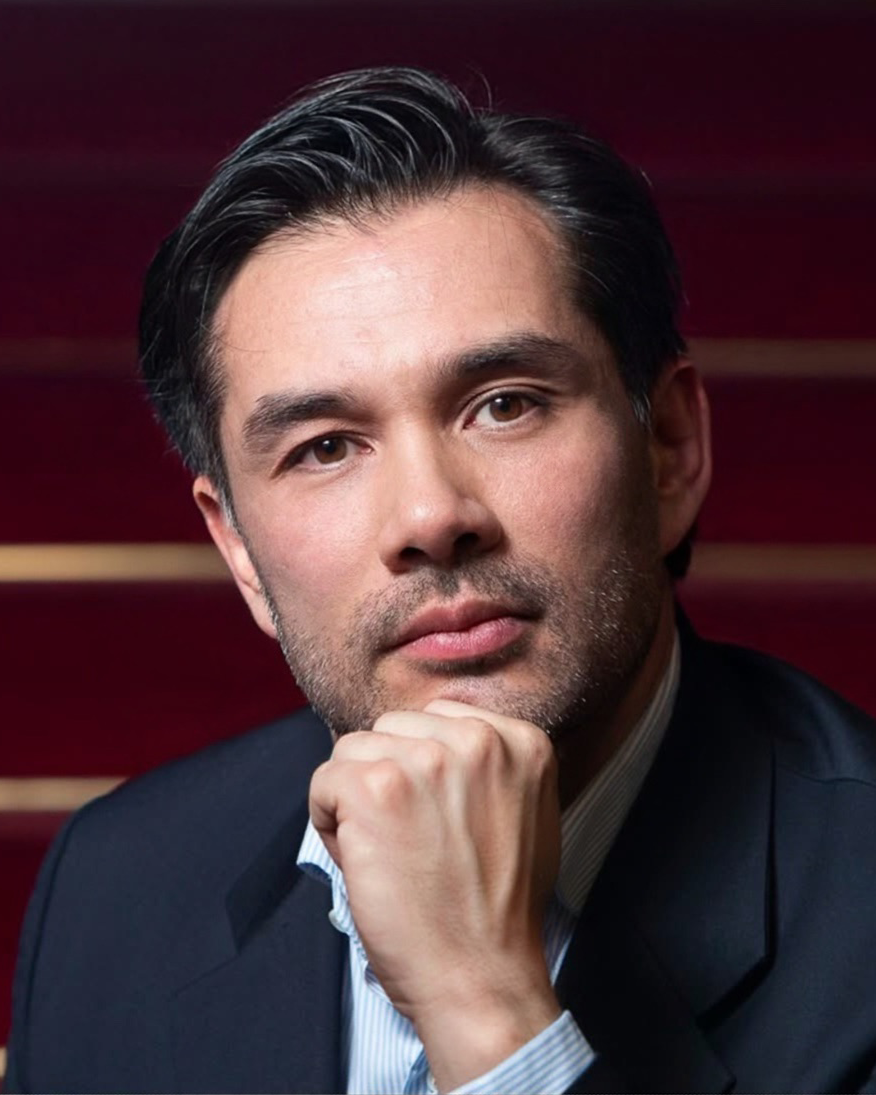
- Born: Manhattan, New York
- Citizenship: United States
- Education: Columbia University, École supérieure d'études cinématographiques
- Occupations: Film director, Producer, Screenwriter & Poet

Stevan Lee Mraovitch is an American film director, producer, screenwriter and poet. His feature film Des vacances a tout prix (Holidays at All Costs) won the Comedy Vanguard Jury Award and the Comedy Feature Audience Award at the 2021 Austin Film Festival.

== Early life and education ==
Mraovitch was born in Manhattan, New York, and raised in Paris. He earned a Master of Fine Arts in Film from Columbia University, where he was recognized on the Dean's list, and a bachelor’s degree from the École Supérieure d'Études Cinématographiques (ESEC), graduating summa cum laude.

== Career ==
Mraovitch began his film production career under the mentorship of Michael Hausman, a Columbia University professor and producer. He worked with filmmakers such as David Mamet and Julie Delpy.

In addition to his film career, Mraovitch is a published poet. His collection, Analgésie - Les cicatrices d'amour et de révoltes (Analgesia, the Scars of Love and Revolts), explores themes of nostalgia and brotherhood set against a war-torn Yugoslavian backdrop.

In 2021, Mraovitch made his directorial debut with Des vacances à tout prix (Holidays at All Cost), a comedy inspired by his childhood experiences of cultural differences. The film has earned nine awards and eight nominations at international festivals, including both Jury and Audience awards at the Austin Film Festival. Reviewing the film, The Austin Chronicle described it as a social satire, while Film Threat called it a Parisian take on the family comedy.

In 2024, Mraovitch co-wrote, directed, and produced the feature comedy Doctor, Doctor, starring Steven He and Damian Young. He later wrote and directed Where There Is Love, There Is No Darkness, a drama about a Senegalese migrant delivery worker in Paris. The film won the Special Jury Award for Bridging Cultures at the Arizona International Film Festival and Best World Cinema Narrative Feature at Kansas City FilmFest International. It was also selected at the 47th Moscow International Film Festival.

== Bibliography ==
- Analgésie : les cicatrices d'amour et de révoltes (poetry, 2003)

== Selected filmography ==
Year	Title	Role
2009	Fragmented Identities (Short)	Writer & Director
2012	Obama E(s)t Moi (Short)	Writer & Director
2012	The Last Photograph (Short)	Writer & Producer
2013	2 Days in New York	Assistant to Director
2013	Phil Spector	Assistant to Producers
2014	Michel (Short)	Producer
2014	Rickover	First Assistant Director & Actor
2014	The Cuddle Workshop	Producer
2016	Kygo I'm In Love (Music Video)	Producer
2016	The Traveller	Producer
2021	The Scrapper	Producer
2021	Des vacances à tout prix (Holidays at All Cost)	Writer, Director & Producer
2024	Doctor, Doctor	Co-writer, Director, Producer
2025	Where There Is Love, There Is No Darkness	Writer & Director
