= No Simple Way Home =

2022 South African-South Sudanese documentary film

- Directed by: Akuol de Mabior
- Produced by: Don Edkins; Sam Soko; Tiny Mungwe
- Cinematography: Emma Nzioka; Akuol de Mabior; Nyasha Kadandara; Atong de Mabior
- Edited by: Angela Wanjiku Wamai; Khalid Shamis
- Production companies: LBx Africa; STEPS
- Release date: 26 November 2022 (United States)
- Running time: 85 minutes
- Countries: South Sudan; South Africa; Kenya
- Languages: English; Arabic; Dinka

No Simple Way Home also known as Nie ma prostej drogi do domu is a 2022 South Sudanese-South African documentary film written and directed by South Sudanese filmmaker Akuol de Mabior on her documentary directorial debut. The film was premiered at the 2022 International Filmfestival Amsterdam. The film encounters the daily struggles of people in South Sudan and recounts the story of the most prominent political family in South Sudan's history. It became the first ever South Sudanese film to be screened at the Berlin International Film Festival.

== Synopsis ==
The documentary owes tribute to filmmaker Akuol de Mabior's own father John Garang de Mabior who was widely acknowledged and recognised for his prominent role in pioneering the liberation movement South Sudan People's Defence Forces for nearly two decades or so in the Southern part of Sudan (which is now known as a separate independent country in the name of South Sudan which gained independence in 2011) and he is currently considered as the founding father of South Sudan who had eventually died in a helicopter crash in 2005 just three weeks after taking oath as Vice President of Sudan and he would later be hailed as a national hero of South Sudan. Akuol was just 16 when her father died in the helicopter crash. The documentary also gives spotlight on former Vice President of South Sudan Rebecca Nyandeng De Mabior who is dubbed as the motherfigure of South Sudan. After growing up in exile, filmmaker Akuol de Mabior returns home to South Sudan to follow her mother's journey into politics. When peace in South Sudan hangs in the balance, the filmmaker returns home from exile with her mother and sister.

== Production ==
The film was produced by Generation Africa in collaboration with Deutsche Welle Akademie, Robert Bosch Foundation, Social Transformation and Empowerment Projects (STEPS), Bertha Foundation, German Federal Ministry for Economic Cooperation and Development and German Cooperation.

== Release ==
The film was premiered at various international film festivals including Zanzibar International Film Festival 2022, Sheffield DocFest 2022, San Francisco International Film Festival 2022, Durban International Film Festival 2022, Encounters South African International Documentary Festival 2022, DOK.fest München 2022, HotDocs 2022, Cinéma du Réel 2022, 2022 Sydney Film Festival and in the panorama section at the 72nd Berlin International Film Festival.

== See also ==
- Second Sudanese Civil War
