= Algeria–South Sudan relations =

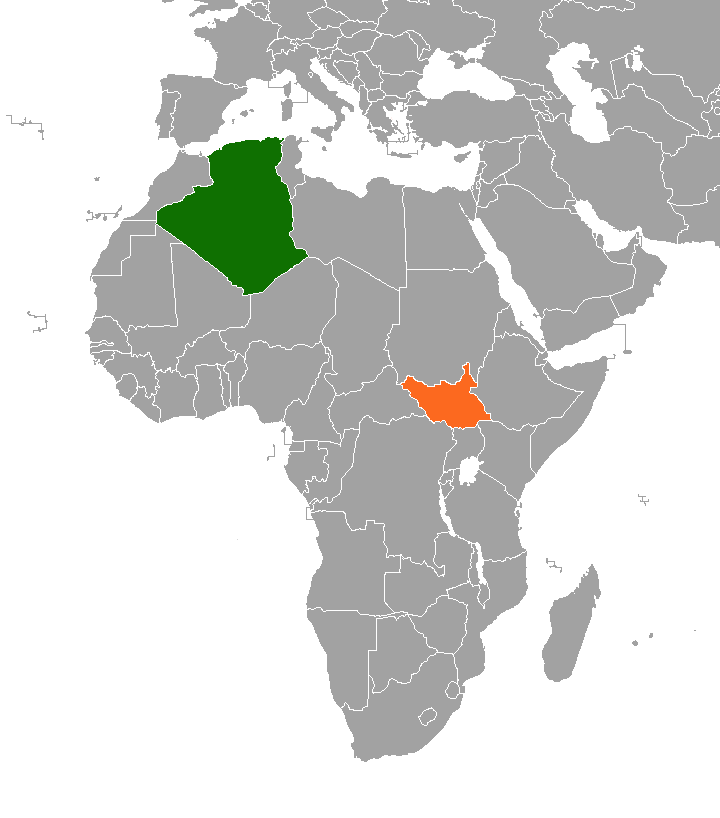

- Algeria: South Sudan

There are currently no diplomatic missions between Algeria and South Sudan.

Before the secession of South Sudan from Sudan in 2011, Algeria and South Sudan had no official relationship and Algeria has ties with Sudan. However, given the Sudanese support for the Islamists in Algeria amidst the Algerian Civil War at 1990s, Algeria had distrusted Sudan and therefore had secretly supported the self-determination of South Sudan and Darfur from Sudan in response for Omar al-Bashir's supports for the Armed Islamic Group of Algeria. This influenced the South Sudanese independence movement, notably the Sudan People's Liberation Army's leaders like John Garang, to continue the struggle against the heavily dominated Arabicized Sudanese Government, which was achieved in 2005.

Following the independence of South Sudan in 2011, Algeria soon recognized the independence of South Sudan from Sudan. Recently Algeria had shown deep concerns to South Sudan crisis and urged for mediations between two nations as part of African Union's peace plan. Algeria had also supported a peacekeeping mission from Japan to South Sudan.
