= The Earth Is Blue as an Orange =

2020 documentary film

- Film poster
- Directed by: Iryna Tsilyk
- Written by: Iryna Tsilyk
- Produced by: Anna Kapustina; Giedre Zickyte
- Cinematography: Vyacheslav Tsvetkov
- Edited by: Ivan Bannikov; Iryna Tsilyk
- Production companies: Albatros Communicos; Moonmakers
- Release date: 24 January 2020 (Sundance Film Festival)
- Running time: 74 min
- Countries: Ukraine; Lithuania
- Languages: Russian, Ukrainian

The Earth Is Blue as an Orange (Ukrainian: «Земля блакитна, ніби апельсин», romanized: Zemlia blakutna, niby apel'syn) is a 2020 documentary film, directed and written by Iryna Tsilyk, who won the Directing Award in the "World Cinema Documentary” category for the film at the 2020 Sundance Film Festival.

== Synopsis ==
Single mother Hanna and her four children live in the front-line war zone of Donbas, Ukraine. While the outside world is made up of bombings and chaos, the family is managing to keep their home as a safe haven, full of life and full of light. Every member of the family has a passion for cinema, motivating them to shoot a film inspired by their own life during a time of war.

The creative process raises the question of what kind of power the magical world of cinema could have during times of disaster. How to picture war through fiction? For Hanna and the children, transforming trauma into a work of art is the ultimate way to stay human.

== Production ==
The film is produced by Anna Kapustina ("Albatros Communicos", Ukraine) and Giedrė Žickytė ("Moonmakers", Lithuania) with the support of Ukrainian State Film Agency, Lithuanian Film Centre, IDFA Bertha Fund (Netherlands).

== Release ==
It was selected for the official program of 2020 Berlin International Film Festival (Generation 14+), the 2020 International Documentary Film Festival Amsterdam (Best of Fests), Documentary Selection by European Film Academy 2020,, 2020 Hot Docs Canadian International Documentary Festival, 2020 Copenhagen International Documentary Film Festival, 2020 Thessaloniki Documentary Festival, 2020 Adelaide Film Festival and more than 100 other International film festivals.

The film had theatrical distribution in Ukraine, Lithuania, France, Italy.

== Characters ==
- Myroslava Trofymchuk
- Hanna Gladka
- Stanislav Gladky
- Anastasiia Trofymchuk
- Vladyslav Trofymchuk

== Reception ==
The Earth Is Blue as an Orange has an approval rating of 93% on review aggregator website Rotten Tomatoes, based on 14 reviews, and an average rating of 8.2/10. Metacritic assigned the film a weighted average score of 78 out of 100, based on 5 critics, indicating "generally favorable reviews".

Guy Lodge, writing for Variety, wrote, "It’s an apt inversion for a documentary in which the roles of filmmaker, viewer and subject are as inextricably fused as life and art". Amber Wilkinson of Screen International wrote, "Iryna Tsilyk offers an intimate and surprisingly playful family’s eye view of life in the Ukraine warzone in her debut feature documentary, which focuses on the Trofymchuk-Gladky clan".

== Awards ==
- WINNER: Directing Award: World Cinema Documentary of 2020 Sundance Film Festival, USA 2020
- WINNER: Best Cinematography award of 2020 International Documentary Association Awards, USA
- WINNER: Spotlight Award of Cinema Eye Honors, USA 2021
- WINNER: Documentary Competition Grand Jury Prize of Seattle International Film Festival, USA 2021
- WINNER: ZIFF Grand Award of Zinebi - Bilbao International Documentary and Short Film Festival, Spain 2020
- WINNER: Grand Prix of Millennium Docs Against Gravity film festival, Poland 2020
- WINNER: DOCU/World award of Docudays UA International Human Rights Documentary Film Festival, Ukraine 2020
- WINNER: DOCU/Ukraine award of Docudays UA International Human Rights Documentary Film Festival, Ukraine 2020
- WINNER: Award for Best Cinematography of Millenium Docs Against Gravity film festival, Poland 2020
- WINNER: Special Prize of the Jury of Artdocfest/Riga, Latvia 2021
- WINNER: Best Documentary Film of Ukrainian Film Critics Award "Kinokolo", Ukraine 2020
- WINNER: Best Debut (Premia Hera "Nuovi Talenti") of Biografilm Festival, Italy 2020
- WINNER: Best Human Rights Doc of Dokufest, Kosovo 2020
- WINNER: Best Documentary Film of Five Lakes Film Festival, Germany 2020
- WINNER: Jury's Prize for Best film of Al Este Festival de Cine Peru, 2020
- WINNER: Press Jury's prize for Best film of Al Este Festival de Cine Peru, 2020
- WINNER: DoXX Award of Tallgrass Film Festival, USA 2020
- WINNER: Bydgoszcz ART.DOC Award, Poland 2020
- WINNER: "Movies That Matter" special prize of ZagrebDox, Croatia 2021
- WINNER: "Best Documentary film" of Golden Dzyga awards, Ukraine 2021
- WINNER: "Best Documentary film" of MajorDocs, Spain 2021
- WINNER: “Best co-production film of the year" of the Lithuanian National Film Award “Sidabrinė gervė”, 2022
- WINNER: Jury Special Award of Ânûû-rû Âboro Film Festival, 2022
- Special Mention: International competition of Underhill Fest, Montenegro 2020
- Special Jury Mention: of CineDOC Tbilisi, Georgia 2020
- Special Mention: Different Tomorrow category at Reykjavik International Film Festival, Iceland 2020
- Special Jury Mention: Zurich Film Festival, Switzerland 2020
- Special Mention: Human Rights Film Award of Verzio Film Festival, Hungary 2020
- Special Mention: Minsk IFF Listapad, Belarus 2020
- Special Jury Mention: Premiers Plans - Angers Film Festival, France 2021

== Reviews ==
- The Earth Is Blue As an Orange review – subtle doc tells Ukrainian family’s war story. Phil Hoad, The Guardian
- Review: The Earth Is Blue as an Orange (2020), by Iryna Tsilyk. Marko Stojiljković, Ubiquarian
- Review: The Earth Is Blue as an Orange. Teresa Vena, Cineuropa
- Orange is the New Blue: Film Review. Zoe Aiano, EEFB
- The Earth Is Blue as an Orange: Film Review, German. Lida Bach, Moviebreak
- The healing power of cinema: Film Review. Lauren Wissot, Modern Times Review
- The Earth Is Blue as an Orange: Film Review. Davide Abbatescianni, Filmexplorer
