= Hubert Sauper =

Austrian documentary filmmaker, director, writer, producer and actor

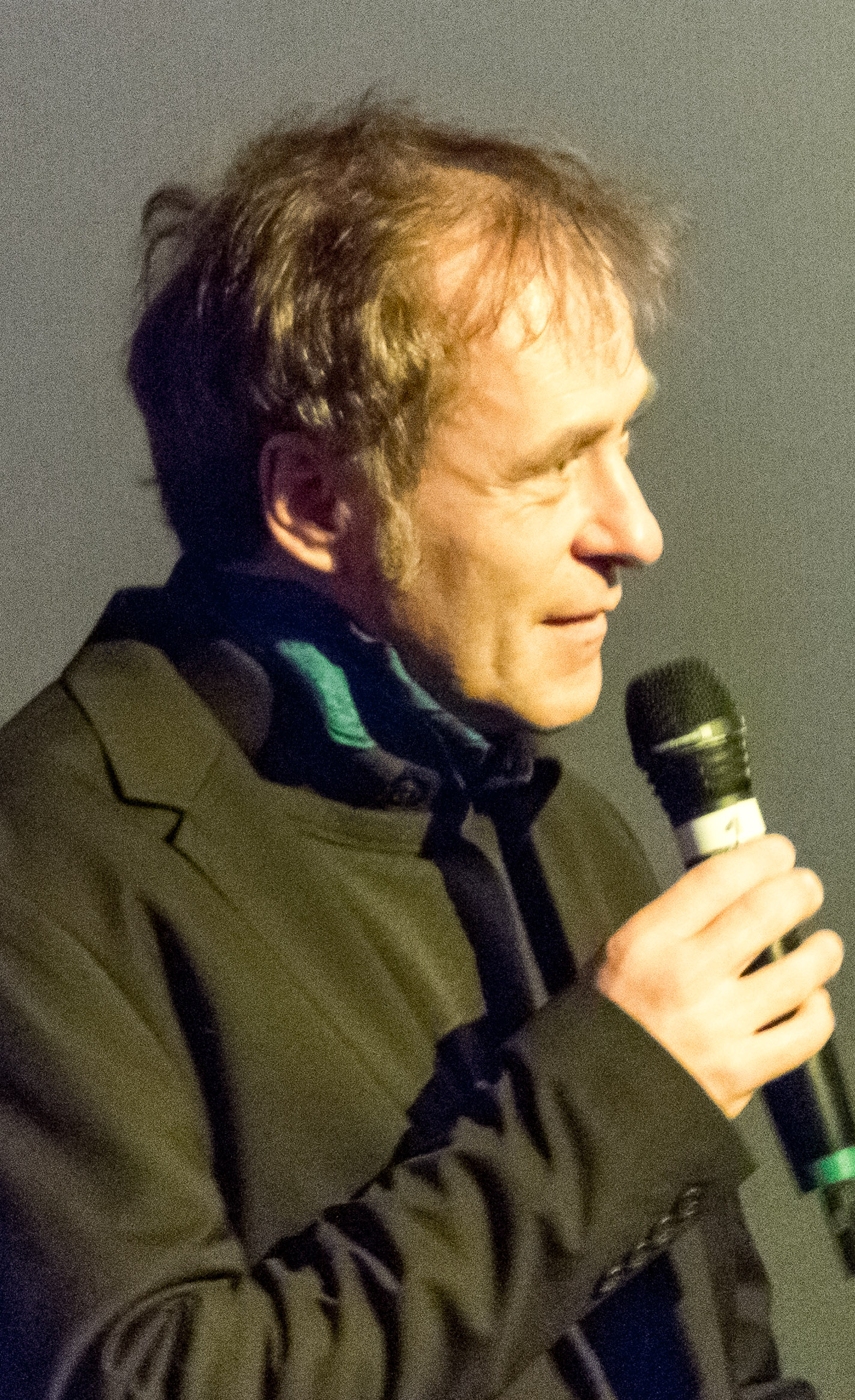
Hubert Sauper at Berlinale 2014

Hubert Sauper (born 27 July 1966) is an Austrian documentary filmmaker, director, writer, producer, and actor best known for Darwin's Nightmare (2004) which was nominated for an Academy Award.

Sauper has lived in the UK, Italy, and the United States and now lives in France. He studied film directing in universities in Vienna and France. He teaches film classes in Europe and the USA.

Sauper is famed for his political documentary films, shot in cinema verite style. He earned worldwide recognition for his film's expression, content, and aesthetics. His films are usually controversial for their explicit political, social, and poetic expression. Sauper's film Darwin's Nightmare was nominated for best documentary at the Oscars, and he has been awarded for his work with more than 50 international film prizes. His two latest documentaries have received twelve International Film Prizes.

He acted in several short films and two feature-length films: In The Circle Of The Iris, directed by Peter Patzak, (with Philippe Léotard), and Blue Distance, directed by Peter Schreiner.

Hubert Sauper is also a member of: Academy of Motion Picture Arts and Sciences, European Film Academy, and Academie Francaise du Cinema.

He has taught as a visiting professor/tutor at Harvard, Yale, UCLA, Columbia University, University of Colorado, Universidad de Caracas, Universidad de la Havana, FEMIS (French film school), Moscow International Film School, Istanbul University, and Southern Mediterranean Cinema School.

== Early life and childhood ==
Sauper was born in the Tyrolean Alps, Austria in 1966 as son of inn keepers, musicians. His father, Anton Hubertus Sauper is a writer and painter. Maria, his mother, is a passionate singer and works occasionally on humanitarian missions in the Balkans. Sauper has spent his adult life in Italy, Southern California - USA, Great Britain, Tanzania, Zaire (now DR Congo) Sudan, South Sudan. His permanent home is since 1995 in Paris and Burgundy, France.

== Education ==
Sauper studied photography in the US, then film directing at the University of Music and Performing Arts Vienna in Vienna, and the Universite de Paris. He was also a guest student at the FEMIS after receiving an ERASMUS grant. His Cinema thesis, published in Vienna, was entitled: "Film as testament", and focused on the three last films of the directors Cyril Collard, Andrey Tarkovsky, and Joris Ivens ("Die Verdichtung"). Sauper graduated with a special mention as director from film school, receiving a Bachelor of Arts.

== Filmography ==
- On the Road With Emil (1993, Documentary)
- So I Sleepwalk In Broad Daylight (1994, fiction)
- Lomographer's Moscow (1995, Documentary)
- Kisangani Diary / Loin du Rwanda (Far From Rwanda) (1998, Documentary)
- Alone With Our Stories (2000, Documentary)
- Darwin's Nightmare (2004, Documentary)
- We Come as Friends (2014, Documentary)
- Epicentro (2020, Documentary)

== Awards ==
Title	Year	Awards and Nominations	Out Of Competitions
Kisangani Diary	1998	Won – Cinéma du Réel Grand Prix for Best Film (Paris, 1998); Won – "Centaur 98" for Best Documentary Film (St.Petersburg, 1998); Won – NY Film Expo Gold prize for Best Documentary (New York, 1999); Won – Don Quihote Prize (Kraków, 1998); Won – One World Media Award 2nd Place (London,); Won – 1st Human Rights Award for Best Film (Nurnberg); Won – 48th International Film Festival Forum of Young Cinema (Berlin); Won – Special Jury Mention (Montevideo); Won – Special Jury Prize for Documentary (Karlovy Vary, 1998); Won – International Humanitarian Award (Geneva, New York, Los Angeles)	
Darwin's Nightmare	2005	Nominated - Academy Award for Best Documentary Feature (US, 2005); Won- César Award for Best First Film (France, 2005); Won Europa Cinemas Label Venice International Film Festival; Won European Film Academy Awards for Best Documentary (2004) "Pris Arte"; Won - International Documentary Film Festival Amsterdam for Best Film in 20 Years; Won - Montreal New Cinema for Documentary Award; Won - Viennale Vienna Film Prize (2004); Won - Copenhagen Dox for Best Film (2004); Won - Belfort Audience Award for Best Documentary (2005); Won - Angers Premiers Plans Grand Jury Prize (2005); Won - Mexico Cine Contemporain for best Documentary Award (2005); Won - Fribourg International Film Festival Best Documentary (2005); Won - Paris Festival de l’Environnement Grand Prix Best Film (2005); Won - Amsterdam Amnesty International Film Festival Special Award (2005); Won - Chicago Documentary Festival Grand Jury Prize Best Film (2005); Won - Thessaloniki Documentary Film Festival Winner Audience Award (2005); Won - Oslo Euro Documentary Distribution Award (Norway, 2005); Won - UN Green Day (San Francisco, 2005); Won - Silverdocs Grand jury prize (US, 2005); Won - Docaviv Tel Aviv Israel for Best Film (2005)	San Sebastian International Film Festival (Zabaltegi, 2004); Oslo International Film Festival (2004); La Havana Latino-americano Fest (2004); Hof (2004); London International Film Festival (2004); Sheffield Documentary Tour (2004); Toronto International Film Festival Real to Reel (2004); Helsinki Documentary Film Festival (2005) Göteborg International Film Festival (2005); Ljubljana Documentary Film Festival (2005); Vilnius International Film Festival (2005); New Directors/New Films Festival (2005); European Film Showcase (2005); South America Documentary tour Buenos Aires BAFICI (2005); Istanbul International Film Festival (2005); Jeonju, Korea International Film Festival (2005); Warsaw Poland Documentary Review (2005); BAM Cinematek (2005); Karlovy Vary International Film Festival (2005); New Zealand International Film Festival (2005); Sarajevo Film Festival (2005); São Paulo International Film Festival (2005)
