= High Tide (2020 film) =

2020 Argentinean drama

High Tide is an Argentinean drama that premiered at the 2020 Sundance Film Festival. It is directed by Veronica Chen and is about a middle-aged woman and the laborers who help build her barbeque pit. It plays on working-class vs upper-class and feminist conflict at a seaside vacation setting. Its worldwide distribution rights were acquired by Buenos Aires–based FilmSharks. It runs for 103 minutes.
