= Everyone's Sorry Nowadays =

2026 Dutch drama film

- International promotional poster
- Dutch: Tegenwoordig heet iedereen Sorry
- Directed by: Frederike Migom
- Written by: Frederike Migom
- Produced by: Ivy Vanhaecke
- Starring: Lisa Vanhemelrijck; Laurence Roothooft; Sachli Gholamalizad; Lewis Hannes; Lewis Gérard
- Cinematography: Esmoreit Lutters
- Edited by: Christine Houbiers
- Music by: Freya Arde
- Production companies: De Mensen; CALA Film Central; Juliet at Pupkin
- Distributed by: Paradiso Filmed Entertainment
- Release date: 14 February 2026 (Berlinale)
- Running time: 83 minutes
- Countries: Belgium; Germany; Netherlands
- Language: Dutch

Everyone's Sorry Nowadays (Dutch: Tegenwoordig heet iedereen Sorry) is a 2026 drama film written and directed by Frederike Migom. The film adapted from Bart Moeyaert’s novel of the same name, is a gentle story of finding your place and following your dreams.

The film had its world premiere at the Generation Kplus section of the 76th Berlin International Film Festival on 14 February 2026, where it was nominated for the Crystal Bear.

== Synopsis ==
The film follows Bianca, a lively 13‑year‑old, who feels overlooked within her household. On an oppressive summer afternoon, a chance meeting with her idol, actress Billie King, sets her off on a path shaped by fantasy, emotional upheaval and personal growth. The experience ultimately encourages Bianca to assert herself and rebuild her relationship with her mother.

== Cast ==
- Lisa Vanhemelrijck as Bianca
- Laurence Roothooft as Mother
- Sachli Gholamalizad as Billie King
- Lewis Hannes as Alan
- Lewis Gérard as Jazz
- Jennifer Muntslag as Malika

== Release ==
Everyone's Sorry Nowadays had its world premiere in the Generation Kplus section of the 76th Berlin International Film Festival on 14 February 2026.

On 16 January 2026, the trailer and poster of the film were released and reported that LevelK boards has acquired the sales rights of the film.

The film was presented at the Kristiansand International Children's Film Festival on 21 April 2026 in Children's program.

In July 2026, it was showcased at the Giffoni Film Festival in Films in Competition. It was also screened at the 32nd Sarajevo Film Festival in Childrens' programme on 15 August 2026.

== Accolades ==
Award	Date of ceremony	Category	Recipient(s)	Result	Ref.
Berlin International Film Festival	22 February 2026	Crystal Bear for the Best Film in Generation Kplus	Everyone's Sorry Nowadays	Nominated	
