= 2005 Khartoum riots =

2005 riots in Sudan

2005 Khartoum Riots
- Date: 1-3 August, 2005
- Location: Khartoum, Sudan; 15.6°N 32.5°E
- Caused by: Death of John Garang; Disinformation

Casualties and losses
Around 130 dead, and over 300 injured	

Casualties
- Injuries: 300+

The 2005 Khartoum riots started on 1 August 2005, after the death of South Sudanese rebel leader John Garang was confirmed. After the death, riots erupted around Khartoum and Juba.

== Background ==
The Sudanese People's Liberation Movement (SPLM) signed the Comprehensive Peace Agreement (CPA) with the Sudanese government in Naivasha, Kenya on 9 January 2005, ending the Second Sudanese civil war. By the terms of the Comprehensive Peace Agreement, SPLA rebel commander John Garang was to be sworn in as first vice president of Sudan exactly six months later. On 9 July Garang was included in the government. The CPA also made Garang president of a new South Sudanese Government.

John Garang died on 30 July 2005 When his helicopter crashed in Uganda, when he was returning back to South Sudan from a meeting with the Ugandan president Yoweri Museveni.

== The riots ==
The riots began in Khartoum on 1 August, after the death of Garang was announced by president Omar al-Bashir. The riots were caused by the South Sudanese migrants living in Khartoum, who believed that the helicopter crash was not accidental and the death was caused by the Sudanese government. The riots started in the downtown of Khartoum. From the downtown the riots spread towards the outskirts of the city. The riots were characterized by looting of homes and businesses, burning of cars and houses and clashes with the police. The clashes continued for three days despite of Sudanese government placing a curfew on Khartoum, and were ended when the military stepped in to calm the situation.

Clashes happened also in other large Sudanese cities, like Port Sudan. In Southern Sudan, Juba, Renk and Malakal there were reports of attacks against Arab merchants and 250 stores owned by Arab merchants were burned in Juba. According to The International Committee of the Red Cross (ICRC) the riots injured over 300 and killed around 130 people of which 111 in Khartoum and 19 in Juba and Malakal.

== Aftermath ==
Salva Kiir was appointed as the new Sudanese vice president and South Sudanese president on 9 August. He urged all citizen to calm, stating "everybody must be calm so that we honour Garang by the implementation of the peace agreement". The United Nations Secretary General Kofi Annan expressed his concern regarding the violence in Khartoum and called for the end of the rioting and looting. The United States called on Wednesday to take additional steps in containing the violence. The secretary of the State Condoleezza Rice sent two senior officials, Assistant Secretary of State for African Affairs Constance Newman and special envoy for Sudan Roger Winter, to Sudan to negotiate with Kiir and al-Bashir.

Al-Bashir announced the formation of an investigation committee on 4 August, in which he affirmed the authorities' ability to establish security and the rule of law after the riots that Khartoum. 14 days after the riots started six men were hanged in Khartoum over the killing of 13 police officers.
