= Untitled Pizza Movie =

- Directed by: David Shapiro
- Written by: David Shapiro
- Produced by: Michael Tubbs; Brendan Doyle; Peter Sillen; David Shapiro
- Cinematography: Jonathan Kovel
- Edited by: David Shapiro
- Music by: Michael Tubbs; T. Griffin
- Release date: January 2020 (Sundance)
- Country: United States

Untitled Pizza Movie is a 2020 seven-part documentary series written and directed by David Shapiro. It premiered at the 2020 Sundance Film Festival, where it received the "Best DocuSeries" award. The docuseries had an exclusive online run at Metrograph between February 26 and March 14.

== Synopsis ==
In Untitled Pizza Movie, Shapiro narrativizes his own past, the life of his late friend Leeds Atkinson, and a once-criminal pizza man named Andrew Belluci, repiecing footage he had shot alongside Atkinson in the 1990s while on a mission to find New York's best pizza.

== Parts ==
- Part One: Ice Cube Trays
- Part Two: Eat To Win In The Elevator
- Part Three: Pizza Purgatory
- Part Four: Zig Zag
- Part Five: The Natufian Culture Of 9,000 BC
- Part Six: Clams
- Part Seven: Mars Bar
