= Frederike Migom =

Belgian actress, screenwriter and director (born 1985)

- Born: 1985 (age 40–41); Antwerp, Belgium
- Education: American Academy of Dramatic Arts; École supérieure d'études cinématographiques
- Occupations: Actor, screenwriter, director
- Years active: 2009–present

Frederike Migom (born 1985) is a Belgian actress, screenwriter, and director. She is best known for the award-winning films Binti, Nkosi coiffure and Malakim.

== Personal life ==
Migom was born in 1985, in Antwerp. After moving to New York at age 17, she completed her education at the American Academy of Dramatic Arts. At age 21, she began to study filmmaking at the École supérieure d'études cinématographiques. After completing her studies, she returned to Brussels at age 24.

== Career ==
Migom started her career as an actress where she made her film debut with Miss Homeless in 2009. In 2010, she worked as the second assistant director for the film First Mission and then in Smoorverliefd as the third assistant director. In the preceding year, she held several posts in the film production crew such as production intern, post-production coordinator and assistant producer after moved to Brussels in 2011 and worked in film production for Caviar in Brussels. In 2012, she made the television acting debut with the serial The Out-Laws and played the role "Bloemiste". In 2013, she directed her first short film, Malakim. Then she made the shorts Adam & Everything in 2014 and Nkosi Coiffure in 2015.

In 2015, Migom directed the short film Nkosi Coiffure where it received critics acclaim and screened at the Tribeca Film Festival and the BFI London Film Festival. In 2017, she directed a short documentary, Si-G. In 2019, she made her maiden feature film Binti. The film made North-American premiere at the Sundance Film Festival 2020, and later screened at about 45 festivals worldwide. In the meantime, the film received positive critics acclaim and won several awards including: the ECFA award for Best European Film for young audiences 2020 and the Golden Lion at Cinekid in 2019.

In 2020, Migom co-wrote and directed an episode for the mini-series Lockdown for the Flemish television. At the end of same year, she wrote and directed the short documentary Angry. In 2021, she started her second feature film Tegenwoordig heet iedereen with the support of the Flemish Audiovisual Fund (VAF).

== Filmography ==
Year	Film	Role	Genre	Ref.
2009	Miss Homeless	Actrice	Film	
2010	First Mission	Second assistant director	Film	
2010	Smoorverliefd	Third assistant director	Film	
2010	Bo	Production intern	Film	
2010	Anneliezen	Post-production coordinator	TV series	
2011	Dikke vrienden	Assistant producer	Short film	
2012	The Out-Laws	Bloemiste	TV series	
2012	The Spiral	Assistant unit production manager	TV series	
2013	Los Flamencos	Bankbediende	Film	
2013	Follow	Jana	Film	
2013	Thuis	Ella	TV series	
2013	De Verzamelaar	Lana	Short film	
2014	Familie	Gail Cockelaere	TV series	
2014	Booster	Laura De Jonge	Film	
2014	I <3 U 4Vr	Rebecca	Short film	
2014	De Bunker	Journaliste	TV series	
2014	Malakim	Director, writer	Short film	
2014	Adam & Everything	Director, writer	Short film	
2014	Adam & Everything	Producer	Documentary	
2015	Nkosi coiffure	Director, writer	Short film	
2016	In goede en kwade dagen	Ellen	Short film	
2016	Fifty Fifty	Helena	Film	
2017	Si-G	Director, writer	Documentary short film	
2019	Binti	Director, writer	Film	
2019	Forgotten - Le Motel feat. Martha Da'ro & Miss Angel	Producer	Video short	
2021	Lockdown	Director, writer	TV series	
2021	Angry	Director, writer	Short film	
2026	Everyone's Sorry Nowadays	Director, writer	Film	
