= Mabior Garang De-Mabior =

South Sudanese politician and activist (born 1977)

Mabior Garang de-Mabior
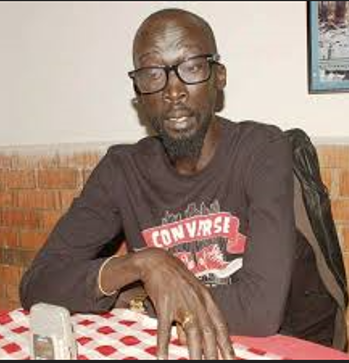

Personal details
- Born: April 12, 1977 (age 49) Juba, Democratic Republic of Sudan (present-day South Sudan)
- Party: SPLM-IO
- Parents: John Garang de Mabior (father); Rebecca Nyandeng (mother)
- Relatives: John Garang de Mabior's family
- Occupation: Politician

Mabior Garang de-Mabior (born 12 April 1977) is a South Sudanese politician and activist and the eldest son of John Garang, the founder of the ruling party, the Sudan People's Liberation Movement.

Mabior's mother Rebecca Nyandeng De Mabior is a vice president in South Sudan in the unity government as of 2022.

== Political career ==
Mabior Garang grew up imitating his father's political career. A notable public appearance was in 2012 when he publicly criticized President Salva Kiir as a poor successor to his father's legacy. In his writings, Mabior claimed that Kiir's administration was unsatisfactory to the people of South Sudan and that the SPLM under the leadership of President Kiir had failed to meet the aspirations of the liberation struggle set by his father.

In 2015, Mabior Garang joined the then rebel movement under the current First Vice President Dr. Riek Machar and was appointed Head of Information Committee of the Sudan People's Liberation Movement-in-Opposition (SPLM-IO).

However, following signing of the peace agreement and return to Juba of the SPLM-IO in 2016, Mabior was appointed as the national Minister of Water and Irrigation, and he became one of the country's youngest politicians to have served as a key constitutional post holder at the time.

Mabior later fled to Nairobi together with other members of the SPLM-IO following the resumption of violence between the ruling SPLM party and Machar's faction in the capital, Juba in July 2016.

In 2018, the government of South Sudan signed another deal dubbed, the Revitalized Agreement on the Resolution of Conflict in South Sudan or R-ARCSS. This saw Mabior come back into the transitional government again, this time as the Deputy Minister of Interior. But he later resigned eight months later over failure by the peace parties to implement the security arrangements which were meant to safeguard the peace deal.

== Controversy ==
Mabior has been described by many South Sudanese politicians and members of the public as a controversial figure. He has been criticized for his carefree lifestyle and attitude, which resulted in him being thrown out of a government cabinet meeting in Juba over dress code in 2016.

== Current life ==
In November 2021, Mabior Garang announced that he had quit active politics. He then established a non-governmental organization called the South Sudan National Conversation, which is an advocacy group that focuses on macro-politics, agriculture, good governance, and rule of law.
