= We Come as Friends =

- Promotional poster
- Directed by: Hubert Sauper
- Written by: Hubert Sauper
- Produced by: Hubert Sauper; Gabriele Kranzelbinder
- Cinematography: Hubert Sauper; Barney Broomfield; Xavier Liébard
- Edited by: Denise Vindevogel
- Music by: Slim Twig
- Production companies: Adelante Films; KGP
- Distributed by: Le Pacte (France)
- Release dates: 18 January 2014 (Sundance); 16 September 2015 (France)
- Running time: 110 minutes
- Countries: Austria; France
- Languages: English; Juba Arabic

We Come as Friends is a 2014 Austrian-French documentary film written, directed and produced by Hubert Sauper. The film premiered in-competition in the World Cinema Documentary Competition at 2014 Sundance Film Festival on January 18, 2014. It won the Special Jury Award for Cinematic Bravery at the festival.

The film also premiered in-competition at the 64th Berlin International Film Festival on February 8, 2014. It won the Peace Film Award at the festival.

The film later premiered at 43rd New Directors/New Films Festival on March 20, 2014. The film also premiered at 57th San Francisco International Film Festival on April 25, 2014 in competition for Golden Gate Documentary Feature.

== Synopsis ==
The film focuses on war-ravaged South Sudan fighting for independence from North Sudan and its President Omar al-Bashir.

== Reception ==
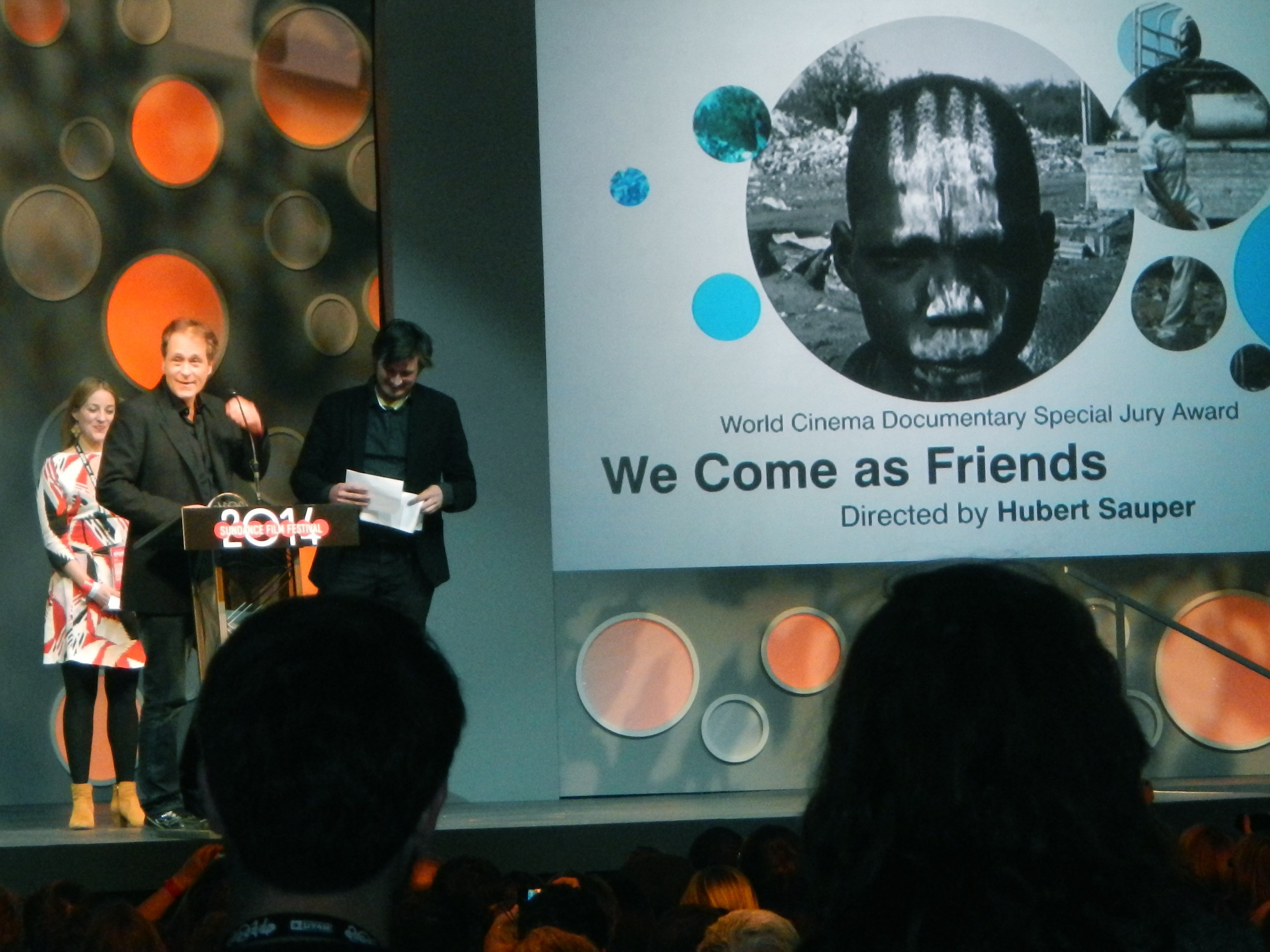
The film won the Special Jury Award for Cinematic Bravery at the 2014 Sundance Film Festival.

We Come as Friends received mostly positive reviews upon its premiere at the 2014 Sundance Film Festival. On review aggregator Rotten Tomatoes, the film holds an approval rating of 97% based on 30 reviews, with an average rating of 8.1/10. On Metacritic, the film has a score of 80 out of 100 from 10 critics, indicating "generally favorable reviews".

Rob Nelson of Variety wrote in his review that We Come as Friends becomes more disturbing as it goes, building to a terrible crescendo in a series of scenes near the end of the film." Boyd van Hoeij in his review for The Hollywood Reporter called the film "A sobering and superbly edited documentary about South Sudan, a country that became independent in 2011 but turns out to be not so independent after all." Dan Schindel from Nonfics praised the film by saying that "A devastating, haunting, but absolutely necessary travelogue of South Sudan. This film is an instructional in how imperialism in Africa has not died off, but merely taken on a new form."

Chuck Bowen of Slant magazine gave the film four out of five stars and said that "We Come As Friends is terrifyingly direct and intimate. Portraying the neocolonialist exploitation of the recently established South Sudan, director Hubert Sauper devises a metaphor that's both risky and brilliantly evocative." In his review for Slug magazine, Cody Kirkland praised the director Sauper by saying that "Hubert Sauper presents a thought-provoking look inside the war-torn and extremely impoverished mother continent" and called the film "a powerful, troubling and possibly life-changing look into the real people involved in this monumental disaster, and the real consequences of economic and cultural imperialism." On December 1, the film was selected as one of 15 shortlisted for the Academy Award for Best Documentary Feature.

== Accolades ==
| Year | Award | Category | Recipient | Result |
|---|---|---|---|---|
| 2014 | 64th Berlin International Film Festival | Peace Film Award | Hubert Sauper | Won |
| 2014 | Sundance Film Festival | World Cinema Grand Jury Prize: Documentary | Hubert Sauper | Nominated |
| 2014 | Sundance Film Festival | Special Jury Award for Cinematic Bravery | Hubert Sauper | Won |
| 2014 | 11th PLANETE+DOC Film Festival | Millennium Award | Hubert Sauper | Won |
| 2014 | 7th Subversive Film Festival Zagreb | Wild Dreamer Award | Hubert Sauper | Won |
| 2014 | 18th Jihlava IDFF | Best Central and Eastern European Documentary Film | Hubert Sauper | Won |
| 2014 | Vienna International Film Festival | Vienna Film Prize for Best Documentary | Hubert Sauper | Won |
| 2014 | European Film Academy | European Film Award for Best Documentary | Hubert Sauper | Nominated |
| 2015 | Akademie des Österreichischen Films | Austrian Film Award for Best Documentary | Hubert Sauper | Won |
| 2016 | Lumière Awards | Best Documentary | Hubert Sauper | Nominated |
