= Akuol de Mabior =

South Sudanese model, filmmaker, and women's rights activist

- Born: Akuol Garang de Mabior
- Education: University of Cape Town
- Occupations: Fashion model; filmmaker; businesswoman; activist
- Parent(s): John Garang de Mabior (father); Rebecca Nyandeng De Mabior (mother)

Akuol Garang de Mabior is a South Sudanese filmmaker, model, businesswoman, and women's rights activist.

== Early life and family ==
De Mabior is the daughter of John Garang, former commander-in-chief of the Sudan People's Liberation Army and the first Vice President of Sudan, and Rebecca Nyandeng De Mabior, a South Sudanese politician and presidential adviser. Her father died in a helicopter crash in 2005. She is of Dinka ethnicity. De Mabior grew up in Nairobi, Kenya.

== Career ==
De Mabior worked as a fashion model and was signed with Ice Models South Africa, Why Not Model Management Milan, Elite Paris, and MD Management Hamburg. In 2011 de Maboir walked the runway in the spring show for Max Mara and the fall shows for Vivienne Westwood, Sass & bide, Paul Smith, and Valentin Yudashkin.

In 2012 she walked the runway in the fall shows for Hermès, Jasper Conran, Jean Pierre Braganza, Louise Gray, and Emilio de la Moren and walked in the fall shows for Damir Doma, Ingrid Vlasov, Max Mara, Peter Jensen, Aganovich, Dusan, Martin Grant, Jasper Conran, Ashley Isham, Paco Rabanne, Julien David, Issey Miyake, and Maurizio Percoraro. At Paris Fashion Week in 2012 she walked for Vivienne Westwood and Chanel.

In 2012 she appeared in editorials for Elle, L'Officiel Netherlands, Dazed, and was the cover girl for Annabelle. She was also part of Chanel's Little Black Jacket Book short film.

In 2013 she appeared in editorials for The City Magazine and The Ones 2 Watch and walked in the fall shows for Costello Tagliapietra, the Academy of Art University, DVF, Thom Browne, Mara Hoffman, and Custo Dalmau and in the spring show for Marissa Webb.

De Maboir retired from modeling and moved to South Africa, where she worked on three independent films. She directed the film Tomato Soup, which debuted at the Durban International Film Festival.

She sits on the board for Embrace Dignity, a women's human rights organization which advocates for law reform to end sex trafficking and the demand for prostitution.

== Personal life ==
De Maboir is a postgraduate student at the University of Cape Town. As an undergraduate, she studied film and media production and minored in writing and gender studies. She is doing a second degree in film theory and practice. De Maboir is a beekeeper and makes lip balm and other cosmetic products from beeswax.
