= The Cost of Silence =

2020 American documentary

- Directed by: Mark Manning
- Written by: Mark Monroe
- Produced by: Mark Manning; Langdon Page; Reuben Aaronson; Nadine Nelson Manning
- Cinematography: Reuben Aaronson
- Edited by: Langdon Page; Lauren Saffa
- Music by: Claude Chalhoub
- Production company: Conception Media
- Release date: January 30, 2020 (Sundance)
- Running time: 84 minutes
- Country: United States
- Language: English

The Cost of Silence is an American documentary film that premiered at the 2020 Sundance Film Festival on January 30, 2020. It runs for 84 minutes and was directed and produced by Mark Manning.

The film is about the April 2010 Deepwater Horizon Drilling accident, and looks at the dangers of offshore drilling. Manning is a former deep-sea oilfield diver turned filmmaker and offers a unique perspective. Reviewers note that The Cost of Silence is well-researched and thorough.

The footage was filmed over nine years and Manning depicts a public health crisis involving the dispersants used to break the oil up. The public health impacts from Deepwater continue to be felt in the region today. Director of Photography Aaron Reuben also described the dangers involved with filming The Cost of Silence as far beyond the typical hazards, given the filming environment.
