= The Mountains Are a Dream That Call to Me =

- Poster
- Directed by: Cedric Cheung-Lau
- Written by: Cedric Cheung-Lau
- Produced by: Madeleine Askwith; Alexandra Byer
- Starring: Sanjay Lama Dong; Alice Cummins
- Cinematography: Jake Magee
- Edited by: Lee Chatametikool; Aacharee Ungsriwong
- Production company: Rathaus Films
- Release date: January 25, 2020 (Sundance)
- Running time: 95 minutes
- Country: United States
- Languages: English; Napali

The Mountains Are a Dream That Call to Me is a 2020 American film written and directed by Cedric Cheung-Lau, and produced by Alexandra Byer and Madeleine Askwith. The film focuses on a young Nepali traveller on the Annapurna Massif whose encounter with an older Australian woman causes him to change course and discover his homeland in a new light.

It had its world premiere at the 2020 Sundance Film Festival as part of the NEXT Program on January 25, 2020. It is in English and Nepali with English subtitles. It was produced by Rathaus Films and filmed in the Himalayas, in Nepal.

== Plot ==
In the Annapurna mountain range in Nepal, Tukten, a young Nepali man, is walking to Kathmandu to meet with people who can arrange employment for him in Dubai. He meets Hannah, an elderly Australian woman, trekking on her own. They travel together over several days.

== Cast ==
- Sanjay Lama Dong as Tukten
- Alice Cummins as Hannah

== Production ==
The film was shot with a crew of only nine people on a 19-day trek in the Himalayas. There is very little dialogue in the film.

Aacharee Ungsriwong, one of the film's editors, was influenced by the dream landscapes of Apichatpong Weerasethakul.

== Critical reception ==
It has an 83% rating on online review aggregator Rotten Tomatoes. Critics praised the vision and cinematography, as well as the natural acting of the non-professional actors.
