= Epicentro =

- Film poster
- Directed by: Hubert Sauper
- Written by: Hubert Sauper
- Produced by: Martin Marquet; Daniel Marquet; Gabriele Kranzelbinder; Paolo Calamita
- Edited by: Hubert Sauper
- Release date: January 2020 (Sundance)
- Running time: 107 minutes
- Countries: Austria; France; United States
- Languages: English; Spanish

Epicentro is a 2020 Spanish-language documentary film directed by Hubert Sauper. The film stars Oona Chaplin and has been described as a travelogue focused on Cuba. At the 2020 Sundance Film Festival, it won the Grand Jury Prize in the World Cinema Documentary Competition and it has a 90% rating on review-aggregator website Rotten Tomatoes. The critical consensus on Rotten Tomatoes reads, "As evocative as it is thought-provoking, Epicentro takes an affectionate look at a people and culture -- and delivers a quietly effective rejoinder to lingering Cold War resentment." It runs for 107 minutes and is in English and Spanish with English subtitles.
