= Darwin's Nightmare =

2004 documentary film by Hubert Sauper

- Darwin's Nightmare promotional poster
- Directed by: Hubert Sauper
- Written by: Hubert Sauper
- Produced by: Hubert Sauper; Barbara Albert; Martin Gschlacht; Edouard Mauriat; Antonin Svoboda; Hubert Toint
- Cinematography: Hubert Sauper
- Edited by: Denise Vindevogel
- Distributed by: International Film Circuit
- Release date: 1 September 2004 (Venice Film Festival)
- Running time: 107 minutes
- Languages: English; Swahili; Russian

Darwin's Nightmare is a 2004 Austrian-French-Belgian documentary film written and directed by Hubert Sauper, dealing with the environmental and social effects of the fishing industry around Lake Victoria in Tanzania. It premiered at the 2004 Venice Film Festival, and was nominated for the 2006 Academy Award for Best Documentary Feature at the 78th Academy Awards. The Boston Globe called it "the year's best documentary about the animal world."

== Overview ==
The film opens with a Soviet-made Ilyushin Il-76 cargo plane landing on Mwanza airfield in Mwanza, Tanzania, near Lake Victoria. The plane came from Europe to ship back processed fillets of Nile perch, a species of fish introduced into Lake Victoria that has caused the extinction of hundreds of endemic species. Through interviews with the Russian and Ukrainian plane crew, local factory owners, guards, prostitutes, fishermen and other villagers, the film discusses the effects of the introduction of the Nile perch to Lake Victoria, how it has affected the ecosystem and economy of the region.

The film also dwells at length on the dichotomy between European aid which is being funneled into Africa on the one hand, and the unending flow of munitions and weapons from European arms dealers on the other. Arms and munitions are often flown in on the same planes which transport the Nile perch fillets to European consumers, feeding the very conflicts which the aid was sent to remedy. As Dima, the radio engineer of the plane crew, says later on in the film: the children of Angola receive guns for Christmas, the children of Europe receive grapes.

The appalling living and working conditions of the indigenous people, in which basic sanitation is completely absent and many children turn to drugs and prostitution, is covered in great depth; because the Nile perch is fished and processed for export, all the prime fillets are sold to European supermarkets, leaving the local people to survive on the festering carcasses. As to why the fish can not be sold to the domestic market to counter the impending famine (local news reports relayed in the film indicated Northern and Central Tanzania were facing famine), one fish processing factory manager says "it is too expensive".

== Reception ==
=== Critical response ===
Darwin's Nightmare has an approval rating of 90% on review aggregator website Rotten Tomatoes, based on 52 reviews, and an average rating of 7.56/10. The website's critical consensus states, "This eye-opening documentary brings some of the shocking effects of globalization to light". It also has a score of 84 out of 100 on Metacritic, based on 18 critics, indicating "universal acclaim".

=== Awards ===
- 2004 Entrevues Film Festival (Entre vues), Audience Award
- 2004 European Film Award for Best Documentary
- 2004 Vienna International Film Festival, Vienna Film Award
- 2005 Thessaloniki Documentary Festival, Audience Award
- 2005 Angers European First Film Festival, European Jury Award
- 2005 Mexico City International Contemporary Film Festival, Audience Award
- 2005 Sydney Film Festival, FIPRESCI Prize
- 2005 Yamagata International Documentary Film Festival, Special Jury Prize and Community Cinema Award
- 2006 César Award for Best First Feature Film
- 2006 Academy Awards Best Documentary Feature nominee
