= Artem Chekh =

Ukrainian writer (born 1985)

- Артем Чех
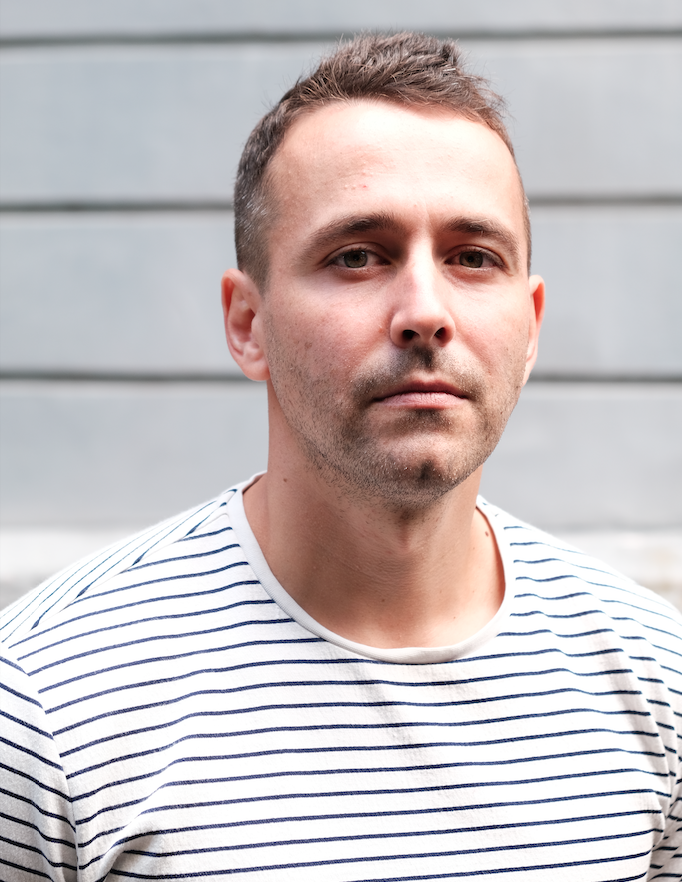
- Chekh in 2021

Personal details
- Born: 13 June 1985 (age 40) Cherkasy, Ukrainian SSR, Soviet Union
- Citizenship: Ukraine
- Spouse: Iryna Tsilyk
- Children: 1
- Education: Sociologist
- Alma mater: State Academy of Leading Cadres of Culture and Arts of Ukraine
- Occupation: Writer; journalist; soldier

Military service
- Allegiance: Ukraine
- Branch/service: Armed Forces of Ukraine
- Years of service: 2015–2016; 2022–present
- Battles/wars: Russo-Ukrainian War; War in Donbas; Russian invasion of Ukraine; Battle of Donbas; Battle of Bakhmut

Artem Chekh (born Artem Oleksandrovych Cherednyk; Ukrainian: Aртем Олександрович Чередник; born 13 June 1985) is a Ukrainian writer and journalist. As a soldier of the Armed Forces of Ukraine he took part in the War in Donbas and the following Russian invasion of Ukraine.

== Biography ==
As a child, Artem Cherednyk made a trip to Prague, and since he returned with enthusiasm, Artem's classmates called him "Chekh". In 1997 he graduated from the music school (piano, guitar, flute). For eight years he played in the Cherkasy Drama Theater, studied choreography, choral chanting. In 2002 he graduated from high school in the city of Cherkasy. From 2002 to 2007 he lived in Kyiv, studied at the National Academy of Government Managerial Staff of Culture and Arts of Ukraine at the Faculty of Sociology. Artem Chekh did not work in his specialty for a single day.

In December 2008, he moved to live in the village of Mryn Chernihiv Oblast for three years, where he practiced downshifting. In 2012 he returned to Kyiv.

From April 2015 to July 2016, he was a soldier in the ATO zone in the 9th armored infantry battalion of the Armed Forces of Ukraine.

Artem Chekh's wife is Iryna Tsilyk, a writer and director.

During his studies, he wrote in Russian, but did not publish anything and did not submit to competitions. Then he studied at the correspondence department of the university, began to write in Ukrainian. His first novel was the winner in the competition "Youth Urban Novel" from the publishing house "Folio" (2007).

Since 2007, he has written more than 16 books, some of which have been translated German, English, Polish, Czech and Russian.

Artem Chekh served in the Armed Forces of Ukraine from May 2015 to July 2016 as a senior shooter and gun layer of armored personnel carrier in the War in Donbas in the Donbas region of Ukraine. At the beginning of Russia's 2022 full-scale invasion of Ukraine he returned to the ranks of the Ukrainian forces. Late May 2023 he sustained a concussion in the battle for the city of Bakhmut.

== Books ==
- You will not find this in Yandex (Ukrainian: «Цього ви не знайдете в Яндексі»), "Folio", 2007;
- Kinya (Ukrainian: «Киня»), "Fact", 2007;
- Anatomical Atlas. It's hard to be a toad (Ukrainian: «Анатомічний атлас. Важко бути жабою»), "Folio", 2008;
- Plastic, "Folio", 2008;
- Doc 1, "Folio", 2009;
- Blue doors on the left (Ukrainian: «Сині двері зліва»), "Folio", 2010;
- Rose syrups («Рожеві сиропи»), "Folio", 2012;
- Awesome Ukraine (co-authorship with Irina Tsilyk), "Osnovi", 2012;
- History of motorsport in Ukraine (Ukrainian: «Історія мотоспорту в Україні»), "Osnovi", 2012;
- 94 days. Euromaidan through the eyes of TSN (Ukrainian: «94 дні. Євромайдан очима ТСН»), "Osnovi", 2014;
- War through the eyes of TSN (Ukrainian: «Війна очима ТСН»), "Osnovi", 2015;
- Absolute Zero (Ukrainian: «Точка нуль»), "Vivat", 2017. The book was translated into English by Elena Jennings and Oksana Lutsishina and published by the Glagoslav publishing house in 2020.
- On the mainland, "Izdatelstvo", 2021.
- Who are you? (Ukrainian: «Хто ти такий?»), "Meridian Czernowitz", 2021.
- Song of the Open Road (Ukrainian: «Пісня відкритого шляху»), "Meridian Czernowitz", 2024.
- Dress Up Game (Ukrainian: «Гра в перевдягання»), "Meridian Czernowitz", 2025.

== Awards ==
- In 2007 he became the winner of the second competition from the publishing house "Folio" "Urban youth novel".
- On January 26, 2018, near the monument to the Hero of Ukraine Mikhail Zhiznevsky on Hrushevsky Street, the literary prize "Warrior of Light" for the work "Absolute Zero" was awarded.
- On April 2, 2018, he became a laureate of the M. V. Gogol Prize for the work "Absolute Zero".
- In November 2019, he received the Joseph Conrad Award.
- "District D" novel was shortlisted for the 2019 BBC Book of the Year Award.
- In 2021, the book "Who are you?" was named BBC Book of the Year.

== See also ==
- List of Ukrainian-language writers
- List of Ukrainian literature translated into English
