= 4.1 Miles =

- Film poster
- Directed by: Daphne Matziaraki
- Produced by: Kathleen Lingo (executive producer); Orlando Bagwell (consulting producer)
- Cinematography: Daphne Matziaraki
- Edited by: Daphne Matziaraki
- Music by: William Ryan Fritch
- Production company: UC Berkeley Graduate School of Journalism
- Distributed by: The New York Times
- Release date: September 1, 2016 (Telluride Film Festival)
- Running time: 21 minutes
- Country: Greece
- Language: Greek

4.1 Miles is a 2016 short documentary film about a Hellenic Coast Guard captain on the Greek island of Lesbos charged with the task of saving thousands of migrants crossing the Aegean Sea during the European migrant crisis. The film was directed by Daphne Matziaraki.

== Release ==
The film premiered on NYTimes.com in September 2016 as part of Op-Docs, the newspaper's editorial department's forum for short, opinionated documentaries.

== Awards ==
- 2016: 43rd Annual Student Film Awards - Best Documentary (Gold)
- 2016: Peabody Award
- 2017: 89th Academy Awards – Best Documentary Short Subject (nominated)
