= The Battle for Laikipia =

- Directed by: Daphne Matziaraki; Peter Murimi
- Produced by: Toni Kamau; Daphne Matziaraki
- Cinematography: Daphne Matziaraki; Peter Murimi; Maya Craig
- Edited by: Sam Soko
- Music by: William Ryan Fritch
- Production companies: One Story Up; We Are Not The Machine
- Release date: 24 January 2024 (Sundance Film Festival)
- Running time: 94 minutes
- Countries: Kenya; United States; Greece
- Languages: Swahili; English; Samburu

The Battle for Laikipia is a 2024 documentary film directed by Daphne Matziaraki and Peter Murimi. The film details conflicts that have emerged after two years of drought across Lakipia in Kenya.

== Premise ==
Shot over a five-year period, The Battle for Lakipia examines tensions between indigenous Samburu people and white ranchers in Kenya and how these conflicts are heightened by drought in the region.

== Release ==
The Battle for Laikipia premiered in the World Cinema Documentary Competition at the 2024 Sundance Film Festival, where it was awarded the Sundance Institute/Amazon MGM Studios Producers Award for Nonfiction. That March, the film screened as part of the CPH:DOX competition.

== Reception ==
=== Accolades ===
Award	Ceremony date	Category	Recipient(s)	Result	Ref.
Sundance Film Festival	26 January 2024	Sundance Institute/Amazon MGM Studios Producers Award for Nonfiction	Toni Kamau	Won	
