= Daphne Matziaraki =

Daphne Matziaraki is a Greek director, writer and producer, graduated from University of California, Berkeley. Her thesis-film 4.1 Miles (with Kyriakos Papadopoulos) received critical appraisal and recognition earning her a Gold Medal at 43rd Annual Student Academy Awards, The film went onto receive a nomination for Academy Award for Best Documentary (Short Subject) at the 89th Academy Awards.

Her first feature-length documentary The Battle for Laikipia premiered at the 2024 Sundance Film Festival and went on to win multiple awards and accolades allover the world.

== Filmography ==
- 2014: Frontline TV Series documentary, production assistant - 1 episode
- 2015: Independent Lens - TV Series documentary, intern - 1 episode
- 2016: 4.1 Miles - director, writer, producer, cinematographer, editor
- 2018: Container - director, writer, producer, cinematographer
- 2023: The Battle for Laikipia - director, producer, cinematographer

== Awards and nominations ==
- Selected: The Battle for Laikipia for the 2024 Sundance Film Festival World Cinema Documentary Competition
- Won: The Battle for Laikipia for the 2024 Hot Docs Canadian International Documentary Festival Land Sky Sea Award
- Won: The Battle for Laikipia for the 2024 El Gouna Film festival Green Star Award
- Nominated: Academy Award for Best Documentary (Short Subject)
- Won: Peabody Award
- Won: International Documentary Association
- Gold Medal: Student Academy Award for Best Documentary
- Won 2017 Pell Center Prize for Documentary
