= Marissa Webb =

American fashion designer

Marissa Webb is a fashion designer and fashion executive. She is the former executive vice president and creative director of Banana Republic.

Born in Korea and raised in the United States, Webb has spent most of her life immersed in fashion. An early childhood interest in sketching, designing, sewing, and styling her daily attire has carried on throughout her life and work. Her aesthetic embodies the melding of timeless ease with a distinct modern edge. It juxtaposes sharp with soft, masculine with feminine, and infuses a touch of whimsical fantasy into everyday reality.

Webb studied design and illustration at the Fashion Institute of Technology. She flourished at J.Crew, where she remained for over a decade in various design roles including head of womenswear and accessories design. Webb has also served as the global creative director and executive vice president of design at Banana Republic.

Webb launched her eponymous label at Spring 2013 Mercedes-Benz Fashion Week in New York, delivering fiercely feminine pieces infused with a downtown cool and masculine edge. Since that debut, she has expanded to designing and producing four collections per year. In early 2016, she opened her label's first flagship store in New York's SoHo neighborhood and, later that year, was inducted into the Council of Fashion Designers of America. Webb encourages women to be original and to explore the many different ways each item can be styled. Her designs cater to the modern woman who appreciates timeless fashion while maintaining the confidence to incorporate contrasting and unexpected pieces.

== Career ==
Webb worked for J.Crew for eleven years. She left to launch her own clothing line in 2011.

While running her own line, Webb became executive vice president and creative director at Banana Republic in 2014, but left the position eighteen months later. She continues to manage her own fashion line.
