= Iryna Tsilyk =

Ukrainian writer and film director

- Ірина Цілик
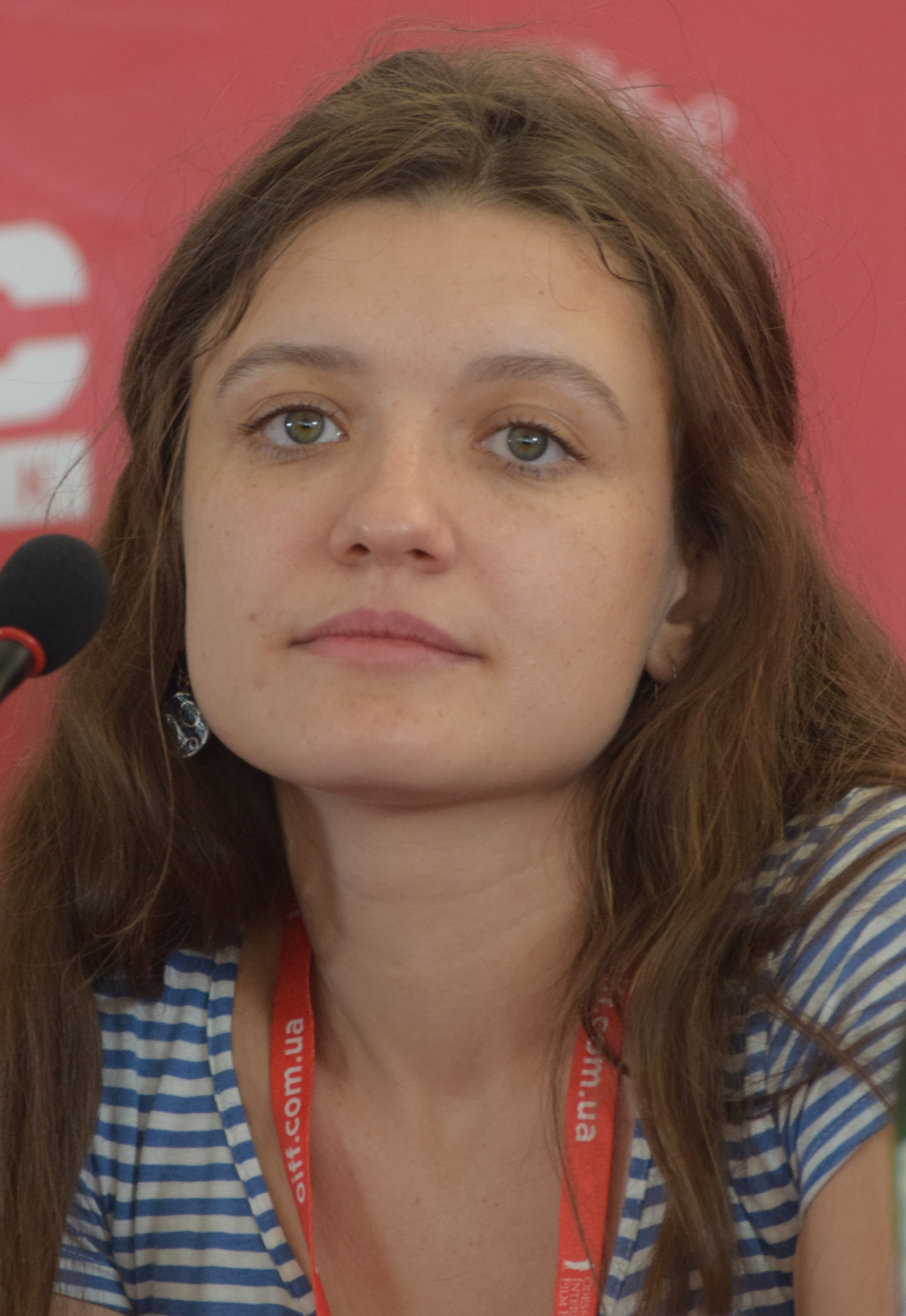
- Born: 18 November 1982 (age 43); Kyiv, Ukraine
- Education: Kyiv National University of Theatre, Cinematography and Television named by Ivan Karpenko-Kary
- Occupations: writer and film director
- Spouse: Artem Chekh
- Awards: Shevchenko National Prize

Iryna Tsilyk (Ukrainian: Ірина Цілик; born 18 November 1982) is a Ukrainian filmmaker and writer, the member of European Film Academy, Ukrainian PEN International. The winner of the “Directing Award: World Cinema Documentary” for the film "The Earth Is Blue as an Orange" at 2020 Sundance Film Festival.

== Biography and career ==
Iryna Tsilyk was born in Kyiv. Graduated from Kyiv National University of Theatre, Cinematography and Television named by Ivan Karpenko-Kary summa cum laude. Now Iryna works as film director and screenwriter and mostly known for the award-winning "The Earth Is Blue as an Orange", "Rock, Paper, Grenade", "Invisible Battalion" projects.

Moreover, Tsilyk is the author of several books (poetry, prose, children's books). Some of her works have been translated into English, German, French, Polish, Lithuanian, Czech, Romanian, Catalan, Swedish, Greek, Italian, Danish; were presented at various international literary festivals and events, such as Zebra poetry film festival, Ledbury Poetry Festival, Poesiefestival Berlin, Vilenica International literary festival, book fairs in Prague, Vienna, Leipzig, Frankfurt, Vilnius and others.

In November 2020 Ukrainian president Volodymyr Zelenskyy awarded Tsilyk the title Merited Artist of Ukraine. She refused the honour claiming she was "just starting my career in film directing" and she consider it "inappropriate to accept such awards with a light heart in times of uncertainty, when many of my colleagues from the film community were offended by the unjust actions of the current government." A few days later the decree that awarded Tsilyk the title disappeared from the official website of the Office of the President of Ukraine.

Iryna Tsilyk is based in Kyiv together with her family. At the moment, Iryna's husband and writer Artem Chekh is serving in the Ukrainian Armed Forces. Iryna and their son Andrii (born in 2010) stay in Kyiv.

== Films ==
- Rock. Paper. Grenade ("Я і Фелікс"; fiction film, 90'). The film had its world premiere at Warsaw Film Festival in 2022).
- The Earth Is Blue as an Orange (Земля блакитна, ніби апельсин; documentary film, 74', 2020). The film had its world premiere at 2020 Sundance Film Festival (World Documentary Competition) and won “Directing Award: World Cinema Documentary” there. The European premiere of the film was held at 2020 Berlin International Film Festival in the Generation program. Also, the film has got two main awards at Docudays UA International Human Rights Documentary Film Festival 2020 and was officially selected to Museum of Modern Art Doc Fortnight (United States), Copenhagen International Documentary Film Festival, Hot Docs Canadian International Documentary Festival, Cleveland International Film Festival, Thessaloniki Documentary Festival, ZINEBI - International Festival of Documentary and Short Film of Bilbao, Institute of Contemporary Arts: Frames of Representation (UK) and more than 100 other International film festivals.
- Tayra ("Тайра"; short documentary film, 10', 2017) and Kid ("Малиш"; short documentary film, 15', 2017) for the cinema-almanac "Invisible Battalion".
- Home (Дім; short fiction film). 12', 2016. FIPRESCI (International Federation of Film Critics) award at Odesa International Film Festival (Ukraine, 2016). Film was included into short film almanac "Ukrainian New Wave. 20/16+" which was distributed in 2016 in Ukraine.
- Commemoration (Помин; short fiction film). 24', 2012. Prize of the Ecumenical Jury at Molodist International Film Festival. Film was included into short film almanac "Ukrainian New Wave. Romantigue" which was distributed in 2013 in Ukraine.
- Blue Hour (Вдосвіта; short fiction film). 10', 2008.

== Publications ==
=== Poetry ===
- Thin Ice (Тонкий лід; collection of poems), 2025.
- "The Road Beyond" (a book of poems in English and pictures by Ruslan Hrushchak), 2022.
- Depth of Field (Глибина різкості; collection of poems), 2016.
- Qi (Ці; collection of poems), 2007.

=== Prose ===
- Red Marks on Black (Червоні на чорному сліди; short story collection), 2015.
- Birthmarks (Родимки; short story collection), 2013.
- The Day After Yesterday (Післявчора; novel), 2008.

=== Children's books ===
- Small travel book: Kyiv (Книжечка-мандрівочка: Київ), 2024.
- The City-tale of One’s Friendship (МІСТОрія однієї дружби; children’s adventure novel), 2016.
- Such an interesting life (Таке цікаве життя; children’s book), 2015.
