= Women in Film Awards Kenya =

- Awarded for: Excellence in filmmaking and creative professions
- Country: Kenya
- Presented by: Women in Film Awards Kenya
- First award: March 4, 2020; 6 years ago
- Website: wifawards.org

Women in Film Awards Kenya (WIFA) is a pioneering annual awards ceremony dedicated to recognizing, celebrating, and empowering women filmmakers and creative professionals across Kenya's film and television industry. Founded in 2020 by Dr. Susan Gitimu, WIFA has become one of Africa's most prominent platforms for honoring excellence and driving gender equity in filmmaking. The awards celebrate women working across all aspects of film production, including directing, producing, cinematography, editing, sound design, costume design, and acting.

== History and mission ==
The inaugural Women in Film Awards ceremony was held in 2020 at the Kenya Cultural Centre in Nairobi, attracting an overwhelming 2,400 entries during its first submission period. The event was attended by Timothy Owase, Chief Executive Officer of the Kenya Film Commission, and other prominent figures in Kenya's film industry. The inaugural ceremony established WIFA as a significant force in advancing women's representation and recognition in Kenyan cinema.

Founded by Dr. Susan Gitimu, WIFA operates under the mission statement: "Where women's stories rise, the industry changes." The organization is dedicated to championing women who shape culture through film and celebrating the women who turn frames into futures. WIFA's core objective is to close Africa's gender gap in film by providing visibility, recognition, and professional opportunities for women in the creative industries.

== Award categories and recognition ==
WIFA recognizes excellence across a diverse range of film and television roles. Award categories include:

=== Technical and creative roles ===
- Best director
- Best producer
- Best scriptwriter
- Best cinematographer
- Best editor
- Best sound designer
- Best lighting designer
- Best animator
- Best costume designer
- Best set designer
- Best makeup artist

=== Performance and talent ===
- Best actress (film)
- Best actress (television)
- Best supporting actress
- Best newcomer (various categories)

=== Industry recognition ===
- Most influential woman filmmaker
- Brand ambassador for women in film
- Best digital content creator
- Outstanding achievement in film

== Notable winners and impact ==
=== Inaugural awards (2020) ===
The first edition of WIFA recognized pioneering women in Kenyan cinema:

- Best Director: Wanuri Kahiu, for her groundbreaking work in Kenyan and African cinema
- Best Producer: Appie Matere
- Best Scriptwriter: Natasha
- Best Cinematographer: Wamboi Mungai
- Best Editor: Roselida Taabu
- Best Animator: Ng'endo Mukii, recognized for her innovative animation work including Yellow Fever
- Best Actress: Brenda Wairimu
- Most Influential Woman Personality: Njoki Muhoho

=== Subsequent editions ===
WIFA has continued to grow and expand its reach with each annual edition. The awards have recognized increasingly diverse talent across Kenya's expanding film and television landscape. Notable winners in recent years include:

- 2025 edition: Jane Munene was recognized as Most Influential Woman Filmmaker; Sanaipei Tande won Best Actress (Film); Celestine Ndinda (Wakavinye) was honored as Best Digital Content Creator.
- 2026 edition (7th edition): The ceremony celebrated bold storytellers and visionary creatives shaping the future of Kenyan and African cinema.

== Ceremonies and events ==
The annual WIFA ceremonies are prestigious events held in Nairobi, typically at prominent venues such as the Kenya National Theatre. These ceremonies bring together industry professionals, filmmakers, actors, producers, and media representatives to celebrate women's achievements in film and television. The events feature elaborate stage productions, live entertainment, and recognition of outstanding contributions across multiple categories.

The 7th edition of WIFA, held in 2026, marked seven years of continuous recognition and celebration of women in Kenyan cinema. The ceremony showcased the evolution of women's roles in the industry and highlighted the increasing diversity of talent being recognized.

== Organizational structure and support ==
WIFA operates with support from the Kenya Film Commission and various industry partners. The organization actively seeks sponsorships and partnerships to expand its reach and impact. WIFA also hosts the annual Women in Film Conference, which advances scholarship and storytelling in the industry, providing a platform for dialogue, knowledge-sharing, and professional development among women filmmakers.

=== Voting and participation ===
WIFA employs a democratic voting system that allows industry professionals and the general public to participate in recognizing outstanding achievements. The awards process typically includes:

- Call for nominations: Industry professionals and organizations submit nominations across various categories
- Voting period: A designated voting window allows stakeholders to vote for their preferred nominees
- Awards ceremony: Winners are announced at an annual gala event held in Nairobi, typically at prestigious venues such as the Kenya National Theatre

== Impact on Kenyan cinema ==
WIFA has played a significant role in advancing gender equity and visibility in Kenya's film industry. The awards have:

- Provided international recognition for Kenyan women filmmakers, many of whom have gone on to achieve global success
- Increased media coverage and public awareness of women's contributions to Kenyan cinema
- Created networking opportunities and professional connections among women in the industry
- Inspired emerging filmmakers and creatives to pursue careers in film and television
- Contributed to policy discussions around gender representation in the film industry

== Partnerships and collaborations ==
WIFA collaborates with various organizations to advance its mission, including:

- Kenya Film Commission: Official government body supporting the awards
- Female Filmmakers in Kenya (FEFKA): Association dedicated to empowering women in the Kenyan film industry
- International film organizations: Partnerships with global film festivals and organizations to promote Kenyan cinema
- Media and broadcasting partners: Collaboration with local and international media outlets for coverage and promotion

== Recent developments ==
In 2026, WIFA announced its 7th edition, marking seven years of recognizing and celebrating women in Kenyan cinema. The organization continues to expand its reach and impact, with increased participation from across East Africa and the African continent. Recent initiatives include:

- Expansion of award categories to reflect evolving roles in digital media and content creation
- Increased focus on mentorship and professional development programs
- International partnerships to promote Kenyan women filmmakers on the global stage
- Integration with the broader Women in Film Kenya 2026 Edit-a-thon initiative, which aims to improve Wikipedia coverage of women in African cinema
