= Softie (2020 film) =

2020 Kenyan film

- Directed by: Sam Soko
- Written by: Sam Soko
- Produced by: Toni Kamau; Sam Soko
- Starring: Boniface Mwangi; Njeri Mwangi
- Cinematography: Chris Rhys Howarth; Joel 'Ingo' Ngui; Sam Soko
- Edited by: Mila Aung-Thwin; Ryan Mullins; Sam Soko
- Music by: Olivier Alary; Johannes Malfatti
- Production companies: LBx Africa; We Are not the Machine; Eye Steel Film
- Distributed by: Icarus Films
- Release date: 2020
- Running time: 96 min
- Country: Kenya
- Language: English

Softie is a 2020 Kenyan film, based on the life of political activist and photojournalist Boniface Mwangi and his family. The film, directed by Sam Soko (it is Soko's first feature documentary) first premiered internationally at the 2020 Sundance Film Festival where it won a special jury prize for editing. Softie, which premiered in Kenya on October 16, 2020, also won the Best Documentary at the Durban International Film Festival (DIFF) 2020. An award that has qualified the film for consideration for the Oscar documentary shortlist for the 93rd Academy Awards ceremony.

== Film festivals ==
The film has been screened at international film festivals including the Copenhagen International Documentary Festival, Full Frame Documentary Film Festival and at the Encounters Festival South Africa where it won Best Film. Softie was also the opening film at the Hotdocs Film Festival and at the Human Rights Festival held in Berlin.

== Plot ==
The film tells the story of the protagonist Boniface Mwangi nicknamed "Softie," Kenyan slang for "wimp," in his childhood years but who has ironically turned out as one of the most daring and audacious activists in Kenya at the forefront of fighting injustices in the country. His activism and the constant danger the path he has chosen poses to his life and that of his family create tremendous turmoil between him and his wife Njeri Mwangi, who is protective of her family.

The film chronicles the activist's seven-year journey beginning with chaos-filled street protests and culminating in Boniface's decision to run for a political seat in his childhood neighborhood, Starehe constituency, where he is confronted by the reality of challenging strong political dynasties.

== Cast ==
- Boniface Mwangi as Self - Photojournalist - Activist
- Njeri Mwangi as Self
- Khadija Mohamed - Churchill as Self - Mwangi's Campaign Manager
- Charles Njagua Kanyi as Self - Mwangi's Opponent - aka Jaguar
- Uhuru Kenyatta as Self - President - Kenya (archive footage)
- Christopher Msando as Self - IT Manager - IEBC (archive footage)
- Raila Odinga as Self - Presidential Candidate (archive footage)
- William Ruto as Self - Deputy President - Kenya (archive footage)

== Awards ==
- World Cinema Documentary Special Jury Award for Editing - Sundance Film Festival 2020
- Best Film - The 22nd Encounters South African International Documentary
- Best Documentary - Durban International Film Festival (DIFF) 2020

Awarding organisation	Category	Year	Nominee	Result
Sundance Film Festival	Grand Jury Prize	2020	Sam Soko	Nominated
Sundance Film Festival	Editing Award	2020	Mila Aung-Thwin Ryan Mullins Sam Soko	Won
Bregen International Film Festival	Checkpoints Awards	2020	Sam Soko	Nominated
Durban International Film Festival	Best Documentary	2020	Softie	Won
International Documentary Award	Best Feature	2021	Sam Soko Toni Kamau	Nominated
PGA Awards	Outstanding Producer of Documentary Theatrical Motion Pictures	2021	Sam Soko Toni Kamau	Nominated
Cinema for Peace Awards	Cinema for Peace Dove for The Political Film of the Year	2021	Softie	Nominated
Cinema Eye Honors Awards, US	The Unforgettables	2021	Boniface Mwangi	Won
Cinema Eye Honors Awards, US	Outstanding Achievement in a Debut Feature Film	2021	Sam Soko	Nominated
One World Media Awards	Best Feature Documentary	2021	Softie	Nominated
African Movie Academy Awards	Best Documentary	2021	Softie	Won
Guanajuato International Film Festival	Best international Documentary Feature	2020	Sam Soko	Nominated
El Gouna Film Festival	Feature Documentary Competition (Golden Star)	2020	Softie	Nominated
El Gouna Film Festival	Feature Documentary Competition (Silver Star)	2020	Softie	Won
History Film Festival	Best Independent Film	2021	Softie	Won
