= Kisangani Diary =

Documentary film

Kinsagani Diary (alternative title: Loin du Rwanda) is a post-genocide documentary film about the lives of Hutus who fled to Zaire till they were discovered along a railway line by the United Nations. The documentary gives account of their hardship, rescue and how they were eventually massacred.

== Synopsis ==
After the massacre of Tutsis in 1994, tens of thousands of Hutus fled to Zaire. In March 1997, Hubert Sauper traveled along in search of these “forgotten” refugees, who were living in famine and disease and still being haunted by various armed militias.

The documentary follows a 1997 United Nations discovery of thousands of Hutu refugees along the railway line south of Kisangani, Democratic Republic of Congo. The documentary gives account of the massacre that took place the night before the Hutus were found. Much later, when the humanitarian aid arrives the Hutu refugees leave the forest and gather in two gigantic camps.

The plan was to repatriate the refugees in the camps but the camps were not guarded. Soon, they were attacked by the Alliance of Democratic Forces for the Liberation of Congo-Zaire and the refugees were massacred and the few that escaped could not be accounted for.

== Awards ==
- Won – Cinéma du Réel Grand Prix for Best Film (Paris, 1998)
- Won – "Centaur 98" for Best Documentary Film (St.Petersburg, 1998)
- Won – NY Film Expo Gold prize for Best Documentary (New York, 1999)
- Won – Don Quihote Prize (Kraków, 1998)
- Won – One World Media Award 2nd Place (London)
- Won – 1st Human Rights Award for Best Film Nurnberg International Human Rights Film Festival
- Won – 48th International Film Festival Forum of Young Cinema (Berlin)
- Won – Special Jury Prize for Documentary Karlovy Vary International Film Festival (Karlovy Vary, 1998)
- Won – International Humanitarian Award (Geneva, New York, Los Angeles)
