= Ashley Isham =

Singaporean fashion designer

- Born: Eshamuddin Ismail; 1976 (age 49–50)
- Education: Middlesex University
- Occupation: Fashion designer
- Label: Ashley Isham

Ashley Isham (born Eshamuddin Ismail in Singapore in 1976) is a fashion designer, based in London.

== Education ==
Ashley left Singapore in 1996 to take a pattern cutting course at the London College of Fashion, and was later accepted into Middlesex University afterwards.

== Career ==
Ashley set up his own label "Ashley Isham" in 2000. In 2001, he also opened a boutique called Acquaint, hoping to "promote fashion talent and support other young designers", quoted from his website. Following this, he opened his flagship boutique, Ashley, in 2005.

In 2007, Ashley was awarded by Berita Harian, Singapore's Malay language newspaper, the Top Achiever of the Year.
