= Rebecca Nyandeng De Mabior =

South Sudanese politician (born 1956)

Rebecca Nyandeng
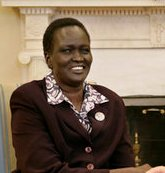
- Nyandeng in 2006

Fourth Vice President of South Sudan
- In office 21 February 2020 – 21 September 2026
- President: Salva Kiir
- Preceded by: Position established

Advisor for the President of South Sudan
- In office 2011–2013

Minister of Roads and Transport of Southern Sudan
- In office 2005–2007
- Preceded by: Office created
- Succeeded by: Office abolished

First Lady of Southern Sudan
- In office 9 July 2005 – 30 July 2005
- President: John Garang
- Preceded by: Office created
- Succeeded by: Mary Ayen Mayardit; Aluel William Nyuon Bany

Second Lady of Sudan
- In office 9 January 2005 – 30 July 2005
- Vice President: John Garang
- Succeeded by: Mary Ayen Mayardit; Aluel William Nyuon Bany

Personal details
- Born: 15 July 1956 (age 70) Bor, Republic of Sudan (now South Sudan)
- Spouse: John Garang
- Children: 6, including Mabior Garang De-Mabior and Akuol de Mabior

Rebecca Nyandeng De Mabior (born 15 July 1956) is a South Sudanese politician who currently serves as one of the vice presidents of South Sudan. She is also the head of the Gender and Youth Cluster.

She served as the Minister of Roads and Transport for the autonomous government of Southern Sudan, and as an advisor for the President of South Sudan on gender and human rights from 2007 to 2014. She is the widow of John Garang, who was the First Vice President of Sudan and the first President of Southern Sudan Autonomous Region, and the mother of Akuol de Mabior.

== Early life ==
She is from the Dinka tribe of Twic East County of South Sudan, and was born on 15 July 1956 in Bor. In 1986, she travelled to Cuba for military training.

== Role in the Government of South Sudan ==
After the death of John Garang, General Salva Kiir took over his positions and became the First Vice President of Sudan and later President of South Sudan. Kiir appointed Rebecca Nyandeng De Mabior as the Minister of Roads and Transport of South Sudan.

She continued to be a strong advocate for the implementation of the Comprehensive Peace Agreement signed by John Garang before his death on 30 July 2005. She continued to support the implementation of the peace process until South Sudan attained independence on 9 July 2011. In 2005 she visited the United States and met with President George W. Bush. She offered a message of appreciation for the American involvement in the quest for peace in South Sudan. In 2009 President Obama continued the efforts with Secretary Clinton and Ambassador Rice to see that the peace agreement was implemented in Sudan.

Nyandeng also received an interview by NPR. She spoke of her commitment to the liberation of South Sudan and how she also respects the necessity of a united Sudan under the New Sudan Vision created by John Garang in 1983. She visited Grinnell College and Iowa State University, the Iowa universities where her late husband completed his education before the Second Sudanese Civil War broke out in 1983.

According to the Sudan Tribune, Nyandeng met with Salva Kiir on 22 December 2013 to discuss security in the wake of the 2013 South Sudanese political crisis.

In March 2021, she tested positive for COVID-19 amidst the COVID-19 pandemic in the country.

In 2024, Nyandeng, acknowledged the government's failure to provide essential services to its citizens and support the veterans of the liberation struggle.

"This one is going to our President Salva Kiir. We should support our veterans when they are still alive so that they can take care of their families"

— VP Nyandeng

She expressed doubts about the re-election of many leaders, including herself, due to their failure to meet the people’s expectations. Nyandeng also called upon the spirits of fallen martyrs to help bring peace back to the country.

== Comprehensive Peace Agreement ==
Nyandeng has expressed dissatisfaction with the way the government of Sudan in Khartoum implements the Comprehensive Peace Agreement. During the years of war, she joined the southern army known today as the Sudan People's Liberation Army and the Sudan People's Liberation Movement. She is known for her support of the right of self-determination for South Sudan although she has nothing against a united Sudan under a democratic rule of law. Millions of Southern Sudanese have been affected by the war between the North and South Sudan which has a long history from the time the British left Sudan in 1956. As a result of war over 2 million lives in South Sudan have been lost and four million South Sudanese are both internally displaced and externally living in other countries as refugees. After the arrival of peace in South Sudan, repatriation process has been made by the United Nations.

== Documentary ==
In 2022, her daughter Akoul produced a documentary called No Simple Way Home, on her family and the work to create a better South Sudan.
