= New Cush =

Human settlement in South Sudan

Coordinates: 4.198°N 33.947°E

New Cush, historically known as Himan, is a small village that lies between Lotukei and Natinga in Budi County, Eastern Equatoria state of South Sudan. It was the headquarters of the Sudan People's Liberation Army during the Second Sudanese Civil War until it was moved to Rumbek. New Cush lies in the Lotukei Mountains on South Sudan's border with Uganda. Since 2006, the camp at Himan has been used for training the SPLA's special forces. The US State Department had provided funding for trainers including Western contractors and consultants and Ethiopian troops. According to a spokesman, the "commando training conducted by the Ethiopians focuses on professional military tactics and specialized skills".
