= École supérieure d'études cinématographiques =

Cinematography school in Paris, France

Coordinates: 48°50′52″N 2°22′49″E

Location
- 21 rue de Citeaux (France) 75012 Paris

Information
- Type: Private
- Established: 1973
- Directeur: Kostia Milhakiev
- Enrollment: Approximately 400
- Campus: Urban
- Information: +33 01 43 42 43 22
- Website: http://www.esec.edu

Established in 1973, the École supérieure d'études cinématographiques (ESEC) (English: College of Cinematography) is a professional school in the fields of film and audiovisual techniques, and the use of multimedia applied to audiovisual works. Through its programs, ESEC prepares its candidates for careers in:

- directing for film & video,
- film & video production,
- video editing & digital special effects for film & video.

ESEC delivers its own diplomas in cinematography and audiovisual techniques. Registered with the Ministry of Education in 1973, member of the FEMIS national college since 1986 until 1998, ESEC is a professional school, training students in the fields of cinema, audiovisual mediums, and multimedia applied to various audiovisual mediums.

As with other national schools, ESEC delivers its own diplomas in cinematography and audiovisual techniques, which are French and international diplomas at level II. These diplomas are recognized as among the most important diplomas delivered in France and are recognized by other universities and professional schools in France and abroad, including in 70 other countries. Notably in the US, at USC (U. of Southern California), UCLA (U. of C. Los Angeles) and NYU (New York University).
