= John Garang =

Sudanese politician (1945–2005)

Dr. John Garang
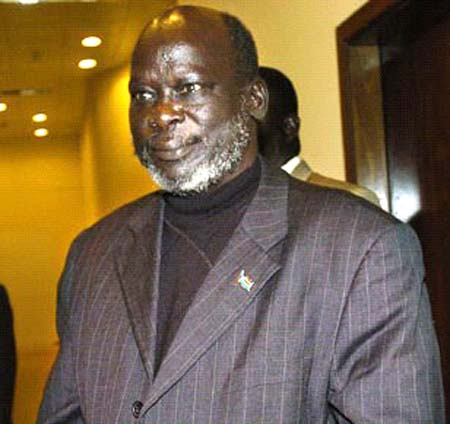
- Garang in the 2000s

President of Southern Sudan Autonomous Region
- In office 9 July 2005 – 30 July 2005
- Vice President: Salva Kiir
- Preceded by: Position established
- Succeeded by: Salva Kiir

First Vice President of Sudan
- In office 9 January 2005 – 9 July 2005
- President: Omar al-Bashir
- Preceded by: Ali Osman Taha
- Succeeded by: Salva Kiir

Personal details
- Born: John Garang de Mabior; June 23, 1945 Wangulei, Twic East, Anglo-Egyptian Sudan
- Died: July 30, 2005 (aged 60) New Cush, Southern Sudan, Republic of Sudan
- Party: Sudan People's Liberation Movement
- Spouse: Rebecca Nyandeng De Mabior
- Children: 6, including Mabior Garang De-Mabior and Akuol de Mabior
- Education: Grinnell College (B.A.); Iowa State University (PhD)

Military service
- Allegiance: Anyanya (1969–1972); Democratic Republic of Sudan (1972–1983); SPLA (1983–2005)
- Years of service: 1969–2005
- Battles/wars: First Sudanese Civil War; Second Sudanese Civil War

John Garang De Mabior (23 June 1945 – 30 July 2005) was a Sudanese politician, political theorist, and revolutionary leader. From 1983 to 2005, he led the Sudan People's Liberation Army/Movement (SPLA/M, Now known as South Sudan People's Defense Forces) as a commander in chief during the Second Sudanese Civil War. He served as First Vice President of Sudan for three weeks, from the comprehensive peace agreement of 2005 until his death in a helicopter crash on July 30, 2005.

A developmental economist by profession, Garang was one of the major influences on the movement that led to the foundation of South Sudan’s independence from the rule of Sudanese president Omar al-Bashir.

== Early life and education ==
John Garang was born on 23 June 1945 into a poor family in Wangulei village, Twic East County, in the Upper Nile region of Sudan. A member of the Dinka ethnic group and an orphan by the age of ten, he had his fees for school paid by a relative, going to schools in Wau and then Rumbek. In 1962, he joined the separatist rebels of southern Sudan during the First Sudanese Civil War. However, due to his young age, the rebel leaders encouraged him and others of his age to pursue higher education and because of the ongoing fighting, Garang was forced to complete his secondary school education in Tanzania. After winning a scholarship, he went on to earn a Bachelor of Arts in Economics in 1969 from Grinnell College in Iowa, United States.

He was offered another scholarship to pursue graduate studies at the University of California, Berkeley, but chose to return to Tanzania and study East African agricultural economics as a Thomas J. Watson Fellow at the University of Dar es Salaam (UDSM). At UDSM, he was a member of the University Students' African Revolutionary Front. However, Garang soon returned to Sudan and joined the Anyanya rebels. There is much erroneous reporting that Garang met and befriended Yoweri Museveni, future president of Uganda, at this time; while both Garang and Museveni were students at UDSM in the 1960s, they did not attend at the same time. In 1970, Garang was in one of the batches of Gordon Muortat Mayen's soldiers, the then leader of the Anyanya rebel group, sent to Israel for military training.

The civil war ended with the Addis Ababa Agreement of 1972 and Garang, like many rebels, was absorbed into the Sudanese military. For eleven years, he was a career soldier and rose from the rank of captain to colonel after taking the Infantry Officers Advanced Course at Fort Benning, Georgia, United States. During this period, he took four years of academic leave and received a Master's degree in agricultural economics from Iowa State University (ISU). In 1981, he earned a PhD degree in Economics from Iowa State University (ISU). By 1983, Garang was serving as a senior instructor in the military academy in Wadi Sayedna 21 km from the centre of Omdurman where he instructed the cadets for more than four years. Later, he was nominated to serve in the military research department at Army HQ in Khartoum.

== Political ideology ==
Garang coined the philosophy of "Sudanism" which would be the guiding philosophy to a secular and multiethnic New Sudan. He believed, for the people of Sudan to live in cohesion, they must not separate themselves into the many existing ethnic factions present within the nation but, rather, to collectively renounce the belief that Black African-ness, Islam, Paganism or Christianity were to be the ultimate defining characteristics of Sudan. Rather, he willed that citizens should embrace all cultures of Sudan, and to unify under the one commonality they all share, being Sudanese.

== Rebel leader ==
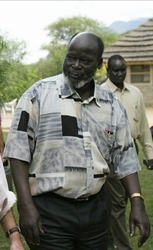
John Garang in 2004

In 1983, Garang went to Bor and southern government soldiers in Battalion 105 who were resisting being rotated to posts in the north. Although he was not among the officers in the Southern command arranging for the defection of Battalion 105 to the anti government rebels, he was supporting the revolution. When the 105 Battalion attacked Sudanese army in Bor on 16 May 1983 under the command of Major Kerubino Kuanyin Bol, who was the leader of the budding movement which launched an impromptu attack, Garang rode by an alternative route to join them in the rebel stronghold in Ethiopia. Major Kerubino Kuanyin Bol and William Nyuon Bany Machar led Battalion 105 and 107 in Bor and Ayot, respectively. As a major, Kerubino coalesced with William to organize a revolt and opened routes to Ethiopian plains. By the end of July, Sudan People's Liberation Army/Movement (SPLA) had brought over 3000 soldiers into the newly created Sudan People's Liberation Army/Movement (SPLA/M), which was opposed to military rule and Islamic dominance of the country, and encouraged other army garrisons to mutiny against the Islamic law imposed on the country by the government. William Nyuon Bany and Kerubino Kwanyin Bol were both founding members of SPLA. Bany was appointed the 3rd high-ranking Commander after Bol.

This action marked the commonly agreed upon beginning of the Second Sudanese Civil War, which resulted in one and a half million deaths over twenty years of conflict. Although Garang was Christian and most of southern Sudan is non-Muslim (mostly animist), he did not initially focus on the religious aspects of the war.

Garang was a strong advocate for national unity: minorities together formed a majority and, therefore should rule. Together, Garang believed, they could replace President Omar al-Bashir with a government made up of representatives from “all tribes and religions in Sudan." His first real effort for the cause, under his command, occurred in July 1985 with the SPLA’s incursion into Kordofan.

The SPLA gained the backing of Libya, Uganda, and Ethiopia. Garang and his army controlled a large part of the southern regions of the country, named "New Sudan". He claimed his troops' courage came from "the conviction that we are fighting a just cause. That is something North Sudan and its people don't have." Critics suggested financial motivations to his rebellion, noting that much of Sudan's oil wealth lies in the south of the country.

In early 1991, Mengistu Haile Mariam's regime (in Ethiopia) was overthrown by the Khartoum-backed Ethiopian rebels (Ethiopian People's Revolutionary Democratic Front). Upon the rebels’ seizure of the government, they closed all SPLA training camps in Ethiopia and cut off the SPLA's arms supply, forcing the SPLA to return hundreds of thousands of Sudanese back to South Sudan. This disrupted military operations and leadership within the SPLA. However, this caused the West to reconsider relations with the SPLA – justifying their providing the SPLA with "non-lethal help."

Shortly after, there were leadership misunderstandings between Garang and senior SPLA commanders, Riek Machar and Lam Akol in August 1991. The splinter group led by Machar and Akol was named the SPLA-Nasir. This resulted in Dinka Massacre which enraged civilians and exposed the deep ethnic divides within the SPLA. The Southern Sudanese communities became more divided than ever before in their history. These organic divides among the Southern Sudanese communities were exacerbated by the deliberate "divide and rule" policies instituted by the regimes in Khartoum, in order to maintain their power over the Southern Sudanese peoples. SPLA-Nasir accused Garang of ruling by force, in a "dictatorial reign of terror"; but ethnic rivalry seemed to have a part, with the Nasir faction mainly composed of Nuer, and Garang's supporters mainly Dinka people. Months of fighting between the two factions left thousands dead in early 1992. The SPLA-Nasir also raised the idea of an independent south (whereas Garang wanted unity).

On 14 September 1992, Bany, who was at the time Deputy Commander-in-Chief of the SPLA and Deputy Chairman of the SPLM, announced his defection from the SPLA, and escaped Garang territory. The following day, Commander Salva Kiir was promoted from Chief of Staff to Bany's old positions of Deputy Commander-in-Chief and Deputy Chairman. Bany joined forces with Machar and Akol, and later joined forces with Bol to form SPLA-United, Sudanese People's Liberation Army-United.

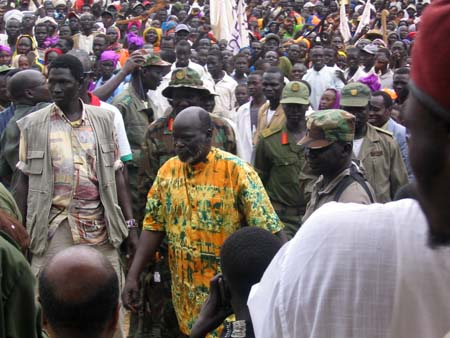
Garang in a crowd of supporters

Garang had refused to participate in the 1985 interim government or the 1986 elections, remaining a rebel leader. However, the SPLA and government signed a peace agreement on January 9, 2005, in Nairobi, in Kenya. On 9 July 2005, he was sworn in as the First-Vice-President – the second most powerful person in the country – following a ceremony in which he and President Omar al-Bashir signed a power-sharing constitution. Simultaneously, he became the premier in southern Sudan. This administration had limited autonomy for six years, at the end of which there would be a scheduled referendum regarding secession. No Christian or southerner had ever held such a high government post. Commenting after this ceremony, Garang stated, "I congratulate the Sudanese people, this is not my peace or the peace of al-Bashir, it is the peace of the Sudanese people."

In the Hillcrest Hotel in Nairobi on New Year's Day 2003, there was a meeting between the SPLA and the Fur people. Garang asked two associates of Abdul Wahid al Nur (who later formed the Sudan Liberation Movement) to declare that the Fur people were with the SPLA – they refused.

Over 15 months, starting in September 2003, Ali Osman and Garang met in private in Naivasha. Their secret meetings and negotiations lasted up until the Comprehensive Peace Agreement (CPA) was initialed on New Year's Eve 2004.

The CPA appeared to embody the vision of the "New Sudan" that Garang wanted. Within the CPA, power was split between the National Congress Party and the Sudan People's Liberation Movement for six years, until 2010, with Garang as the first vice-president.

As a leader, John Garang's democratic credentials were often questioned. For example, according to Gill Lusk, "John Garang did not tolerate dissent and anyone who disagreed with him was either imprisoned or killed". Under his leadership, the SPLA was accused of human rights abuses.

The ideological profile of SPLA was as shadowy as Garang himself. He varied from Marxism to drawing support from Christian fundamentalists in the US.

The United States State Department argued that Garang's presence in the government would have helped solve the Darfur conflict in western Sudan, but others consider these claims "excessively optimistic". U.S. President George W. Bush, who supported South Sudanese independence, especially considered Garang to be a promising leader and called him a "partner in peace." Bush highlighted Garang's Christian faith, and even connected him to support at evangelical churches in his hometown of Midland, Texas.

Garang effectively used radio to advance his cause.

== Death ==
In late July 2005, Garang died after the Ugandan presidential Mi-172 helicopter he was flying in crashed. He had been returning from a meeting in Rwakitura with long-time ally President Yoweri Museveni of Uganda. He did not tell the Sudanese government that he was going to this meeting and therefore, did not take the presidential plane. In fact, Garang had said he was going to spend the weekend in New Cush, a small village near the Kenyan borders founded by Garang himself. To this day, neither the identity of any other participants at the meeting nor its purpose is known.

After the helicopter had been missing for more than 24 hours, the Ugandan president notified the Sudanese government, which in turn contacted the SPLM for information. The SPLM responded that the helicopter Garang was taking had landed safely at an old SPLA training camp. The Sudanese state television duly reported this. A few hours later, Abdel Basset Sabdarat, Sudan's Information Minister, then appeared on TV to refute the earlier report that Garang's helicopter landed safely. It was Yasir Arman, the SPLA/M spokesperson, who had told the government that Garang's plane had landed safely and his intention, in doing so, was to buy time for internal succession arrangements within the SPLA, before Garang's death was to be declared. Garang's helicopter crashed on Friday and he remained 'missing' throughout Saturday. During this time, the government believed he was still resolving his affairs in Southern Sudan. Finally, a statement released by the office of the Sudanese President, Omar el-Bashir, confirmed that the Ugandan presidential helicopter had crashed into "a mountain range in southern Sudan because of poor visibility and this resulted in the death of Dr. John Garang DeMabior, six of his colleagues and seven Ugandan crew members." According to the Sudan Tribune John Garang's legacy was a major cornerstone in South Sudan's fight for independence. Without Garang, many marginalized people of Africa, including that of Sudan would still be largely forgotten about in the modern world.

The death of Garang caused major riots to flare up in Khartoum and other big cities around Sudan.

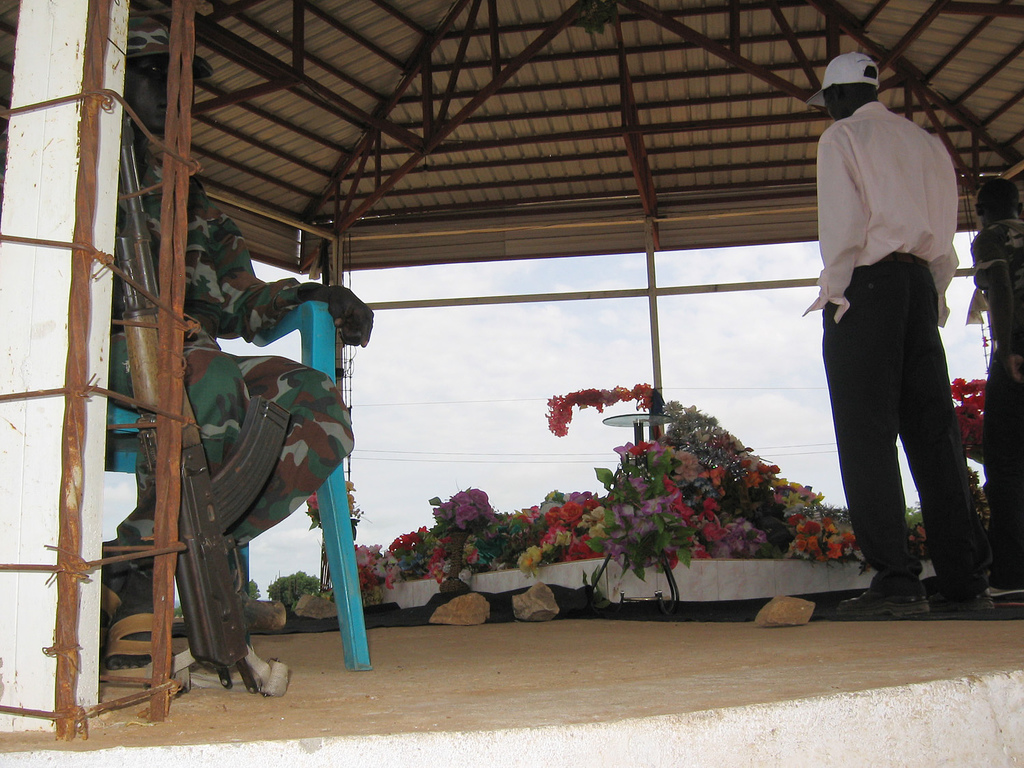
Grave of John Garang in Juba, South Sudan - guarded by SPLA-soldiers

His body was flown to New Cush, a southern Sudanese settlement near the scene of the crash, where former rebel fighters and civilian supporters gathered to pay their respects to Garang. Garang's funeral took place on August 3 in Juba. His widow, Rebecca Nyandeng De Mabior, promised to continue his work stating, "In our culture we say 'if you kill the lion, you see what the lioness will do'."

=== Rumors ===
Both the Sudanese government and the head of the SPLA blamed the weather for the accident. There are, however, doubts as to whether this was the true cause, especially among the rank and file of the SPLA. Yoweri Museveni, the Ugandan President, said of the incident, "Some people say accident, it may be an accident, it may be something else" and said there may have been an "external factor" that caused the crash.

The SPLM/SPLA Rumbek crisis, which took place in Rumbek from November 29 to December 1, 2004, one month before the signing of the CPA is also believed to have been a factor relevant to John Garang's death.

While the Sudanese people followed the Naivasha peace talks closely, with high hopes of freedom and democratic transformation, the Sudan People’s Liberation Movement (SPLM) was rife with rumors and accusations of conspiracy relating to the removal of SPLM deputy Chairman, Salva Kiir, and his replacement with the young Nhial Deng Nhial. Nhial Deng Nhial was the son of the famous leader of the southern Sudanese, William Deng Nhial, who had been assassinated by the Sudanese army in 1968. William Deng Nhial had led the Sudan African National Union (SANU) in exile, but had returned to Sudan to take part in the 1968 elections, shortly before he was killed. It has been reported that Salva Kiir disagreed with the amnesty afforded to Riek Machar and Lam Akol after their coup attempt against Garang in 2003; he also disliked Garang's decision to give Machar a leadership position as his deputy. It is rumored that in response to these actions by Garang, Kiir threatened to lead an armed revolt against South Sudan's leadership.

== See also ==
- Assassination of Juvénal Habyarimana and Cyprien Ntaryamira
- First Sudanese Civil War
- List of unsolved deaths
- Second Sudanese Civil War
- Sudan People's Liberation Army

== Publications ==
- Garang, John, 1987 John Garang Speaks. M. Khalid, ed. London: Kegan Paul International.

Political offices
Preceded by Position re-established	President of the Government of Southern Sudan; 2005	Succeeded by Salva Kiir
Preceded by Ali Osman Taha	First Vice President of Sudan; 2005	Succeeded by Salva Kiir
