= Jonglei clashes (2025–present) =

Clashes in South Sudan

- Part of aftermath of the South Sudanese Civil War
- Territorial control as of 26 January 2026
Date	24 December 2025–present
Location	Jonglei, South Sudan
Status	Ongoing: SPLA-IO captures several towns in Jonglei; SSPDF launches Operation Enduring Peace to regain lost territory

Belligerents
(South Sudan) SPLA-IO; Nuer White Army	South Sudan

Commanders and leaders
(South Sudan) Riek Machar (POW) (South Sudan) Nathaniel Oyet (South Sudan) Simon Gatwech Dual; Ter Chuol Gatkuoth (South Sudan) Much Banang	(South Sudan) Salva Kiir; Santino Deng Wol; General Johnson Olony

Units involved
(South Sudan) SPLA-IO; (South Sudan) SPLA-IO Kit-Gwang; (South Sudan) SSOA defectors; Nuer White Army	SSPDF; Agwelek forces

Strength
Unknown	Unknown

Casualties and losses
>46	>150
- 140+ civilian deaths, 230,000 people displaced

Beginning in December 2025, and intensifying in 2026, clashes began between the Sudan People's Liberation Movement-in-Opposition (SPLA-IO) and South Sudan People's Defence Forces (SSPDF) within Jonglei State, South Sudan. The SPLA-IO launched an offensive in late December to capture several government strongholds within the majority Nuer Jonglei State in response to the continued imprisonment and treason trial of their leader Riek Machar after the 2025 Nasir clashes. On 25 January 2026, the SSPDF announced the launch of Operation Enduring Peace to retake territory from the SPLA-IO.

The clashes have led to fears that South Sudan would return to their civil war, which ended in 2020 with a power-sharing agreement, although Kiir's government claims that South Sudan would not return to civil conflict. It has also led to fears that the nation would be dragged into the civil war in neighboring Sudan.

== Timeline ==
=== Initial offensives and capture of Yuai ===
On 23 December, 2025, the SPLA-IO accused South Sudanese forces of launching an attack on their base at Panyim, targeting the SPLA-IO commissioner for Nyirol County Peter Koang. In response, the SPLA-IO launched an attack on Waat, described as an SSPDF stronghold in the Lou Nuer area and the headquarters of Nyirol County, capturing the town and killing several government soldiers and threatening an advance on the strategic town of Yuai. Over the next several days, the SPLA-IO advanced to Pathai, capturing it by 28 December, with Peter Koang stated that fighting would continue until Riek Machar was released and the SSPDF withdrew from Lou Nuer areas. The next day, the SSPDF launched an airstrike on SPLA-IO controlled Lankien, killing at least 11 civilians. The SSPDF subsequently announced evacuation order for Nyirol, Uror, and Akobo counties. By 2 January, SPLA-IO advanced to Yuai, capturing it after a short battle, effectively dissolving SSPDF presence in Nyirol, Uror, and Akobo, beside small pockets in the Pading and Pulturuk areas. During the fighting, a head chief of ethnic peace mission was killed.

On 3 January, 1,000 SSOA soldiers, led by Brigadier General Much Banang, defected to the Jonglei SPLA-IO after the SSOA was reportedly planning to integrate into the SSPDF. On the same day, the SPLA-IO captured an SSPDF base in Wau Payam, Ayod County. On 7 January, Canada, Germany, Japan, the Netherlands, Norway, Switzerland, the United Kingdom, and the United States condemned an order by SPLM-IO commander Major General John Bayak to seize aid vehicles in Jonglei, which the SPLM-IO denied as fake news.

=== Capture of Pajut and subsequent government counteroffensive ===
By the 10th, SSPDF forces began stationing in Pajut for possible offensive.. Despite this troop buildup, six days later the SPLA-IO Kit-Gwang faction, which signed a peace agreement with the government in February 2025 announced their capture of Pajut. Kit-Gwang's leader Gen. Simon Gatwech Dual stated that their earlier peace agreement was voided, and claimed that fighting would continue to Juba. On 19 January, SPLA-IO forces in Pigi County attacked the SSPDF base at Mat Boma before retreating to Ayok village.

We are tired of the problem of Greater Upper Nile [...] When we arrive there, I don't want you to spare an elderly, or a chicken, a house, nor even a life, so that they don't disturb us every year.

— Johnson Olony, 24 January 2026, as translated by Sudans Post

On 19 January after a short offensive, the SSPDF claimed to have recaptured Pajut and killed 46 soldiers, which the SPLA-IO denied. Two days later, SSPDF forces mass in Baidit, preparing to reinforce Poktap and Ayod. During a speech to his militia at Badait, Gen. Johnson Olony told his troops to "spare no one" and "raze every home," drawing condemnation and accusations of human rights abuses from international organisations.

On 25 January, the SSPDF declared a second evacuation order for SPLA-IO controlled counties, alongside officially announcing the beginning Operation Enduring Peace, an offensive to recapture lost territories. The SPLA-IO withdrew from Pajut ahead of the offensive, subsequently regrouping in Yuai and other areas of Uror County. Fighting reached Tiam Payam, near Yuai town. The SPLA-IO confirmed that Tiam Payam and parts of Wek in Wickol Payam came under the control of the SSPDF on 26 January. Further SSPDF advances toward Panyok and Wau Payam were repelled. Opposition forces accused the army of burning homes during their advance. On 30 January, tensions were further inflamed by Gen. Johnson Olony after, on a social media post in Poktop, Olony claimed that violence could be quelled by the creation of an ethnic "Nuer State" separate from South Sudan.

On 3 February, the South Sudanese military claimed that it had recaptured all bases in northern Jonglei previously lost during the SPLA-IO's offensive. The next day, the SPLM-IO's spokesperson Pal Mai Deng confirmed that the opposition had withdrew from Motot, Pajut, Pathai, Pieri and Yuai, but stated that the withdrawal was tactical and accused the government of atrocities against the civilians in the towns. On 1 March, at least 178 people were killed in an attack by armed youths linked to a rebel faction in Abiemnom County, Ruweng Administrative Area.

==== Akobo offensive ====
On 6 March, the SSPDF issued an evacuation order for the opposition-held town of Akobo, calling for United Nations (UN) staff and NGOs to leave within 72 hours in preparation for a military offensive. Akobo had a large number of internally displaced persons due to the presence of a temporary United Nations Mission in South Sudan base established in February 2018; this number included 17,000 people who had been displaced by fighting in the preceding weeks. The evacuation order was condemned by the Troika of Norway, the United Kingdom, and the United States, and the UN said its base would remain open in defiance of the order. On 10 March, the SSPDF attacked Akobo. The result of the fighting was initially unclear; the SSPDF stated that it took control of the town, while the SPLA-IO claimed that it had repulsed the attack. However, by 14 March, the SSPDF was in control of Akobo, with troops fully deployed in the town. On 14 April SPLA-IO forces entered Akobo and recaptured it from the SSPDF forces.

==== Continued clashes ====
On 5 July, rebels seized Walgak Payman in Jonglei State after killing 44 soldiers. On 24 August, two Ethiopian U.N. peacekeepers were killed, and seven others injured, when unidentified gunmen ambushed a UNMISS patrol travelling to Pajut in Jonglei State.

== Related clashes ==
=== Eastern Equatoria ===
On 2 January, clashes erupted at Nadapal and SPLA-IO claimed to have captured the border town. On 12 January, the SPLA-IO advanced north to begin a siege of the town of Narus.

=== Central Equatoria ===
On 29 March, 2026, at least 70 people were killed in clashes at a gold mine in Jebel Iraq.

=== Unity State ===
On 4 January, the SPLA-IO claimed to have captured the SSPDF base at Tor Abieth, Rubkona County after the SSPDF attacked an SPLA-IO base at Kubri-Jamus. The government of Unity State refuted the claim, claiming to have repulsed attacks on Tor Abieth and Dingding, although residents claimed that the SPLA-IO had captured Dingding. On 8 January, the SPLA-IO clashed with armed youth at Rupkong, Leer county, over the appointment of a commander.

=== Upper Nile State ===
On 7 February, opposition forces launched an attack on Baliet before reportedly being repelled.

=== Warrap State ===
On 29 August 2026, an attack on a cattle camp in Majak Payam, Warrap State, killed 49 people and injures 33 others.

On 22 November, at least 15 people were killed by Nuer White Army rebels in Tonj East County, Warrap, four armed attackers with SPLA-IO uniforms were also killed.

== Humanitarian impact ==
As of late January 2026, at least 200 people have been reported dead, including 40 civilians, due to the clashes. Alongside this, over 280,000 people have been displaced, with cholera reportedly spreading in refugee camps in Duk County due to overcrowding. 450,000 children are also at risk of malnutrition due to conflict.

The clashes have led to fears of ethnic violence, especially after inflammatory statements by South Sudanese military officials such as John Ulony, and an intensification of the long-running South Sudanese civil war, which had previously been moderated to small-scale clashes since a peace agreement in 2018. Such intensification, multiple organisations have stated, would consequently worsen the humanitarian issues in South Sudan. These fears have been worsened due to humanitarian organisations being included in the SSPDF's evacuation orders for Jonglei counties, restricting organisations like Doctors Without Borders from accessing the territory.
