= South Sudanese Civil War =

2013–2018 conflict in South Sudan

- Part of Ethnic violence in South Sudan
- Military situation in South Sudan on 26 January 2026 Under control of the Government of South Sudan and Allies Under control of the Sudan People's Liberation Movement-in-Opposition and Allies Under control of the Government of Peace and Unity Under control of the UNISFA
Date	15 December 2013 – 12 September 2018 (4 years, 8 months and 4 weeks)
Location	South Sudan with spillovers into Uganda
Result	See §2018 peace agreement and continuing conflicts

Participants
South Sudan; SPLM; SPLA; Air Force; Mathiang Anyoor; Maban Defence Force; Allied militias: SSLM; (South Sudan) Agwelek forces (after 2025); SRF; JEM (Note: The SPLM-IO accused JEM of supporting Kiir's government since 2013, though JEM has denied any involvement and claims to maintain neutrality in the South Sudanese Civil War. The Sudanese government, aid workers and other sources have however affirmed that JEM is taking part in conflict on the side of the South Sudanese government.); SPLM–N (alleged); SLA-AW; SLA-MM; EUPF (alleged); Uganda; Egypt (alleged)	(United Nations) UNMISS; (United Nations) Regional Protection Force; Rwanda; Ethiopia	(South Sudan) SPLM-IO; Nuer White Army; (South Sudan) SSDM; Cobra Faction (Note: The Cobra Faction openly opposed the government until 2014, and remained in relative opposition until 2015, when it divided into a pro-government and pro-SPLM-IO faction, the latter of which formed the Greater Pibor Forces. In early 2016, the Cobra Faction effectively disbanded, when the remaining group joined the government. In September 2016, however, the Cobra Faction was declared restored by some of its commanders and declared that it had resumed its struggle against the government.); Greater Pibor Forces (since 2015); (South Sudan) Agwelek forces (before 2025); TFNF; SSFDP; South Sudan National Army; NAS; Arrow Boys (since November 2015); (South Sudan) Islamic Movement for the Liberation of Raja; (South Sudan) SSOA (until September 2018); (South Sudan) SSOMA/NSSSOG (until January 2020); Sudan (South Sudanese government claim)

Commanders and leaders
(South Sudan) Salva Kiir (South Sudan) Gabriel Jok Riak (from 2018) (South Sudan) James Ajongo Mawut # (2017–2018) (South Sudan) Paul Malong Awan (2014–2017) (South Sudan) James Hoth Mai (until 2014) (South Sudan) Kuol Manyang (South Sudan) Peter Par Jiek † (Uganda) Yoweri Museveni (Uganda) Katumba Wamala; Matthew Puljang	(United Nations) (New Zealand) David Shearer (from 2016) (United Nations) (Denmark) Ellen Margrethe Løj (2014–2016) (United Nations) (Norway) Hilde Frafjord Johnson (until 2014)	(South Sudan) Riek Machar (South Sudan) Paulino Zangil (Note: Zangil served as commander of the SSDM/A – Cobra Faction since 2013 until he deserted with much of his troops to the SPLM-IO in 2015, forming the "Greater Pibor Forces".) (South Sudan) Thomas Cirilo (South Sudan) Gabriel Changson Chang (South Sudan) Peter Gadet # (South Sudan) Lam Akol; Khalid Botrous (from 2016); David Yau Yau (2013–2016) (Note: Yau Yau led the SSDM/A – Cobra Faction in open opposition to the SPLM government until 2014, and in relatively peaceful autonomy until 2015, when much of his forces deserted to the SPLM-IO. In 2016, he and his remaining loyalists joined the SPLM.) (South Sudan) John Uliny (South Sudan) Gabriel Tang †; Yoanis Okiech †; Paul Malong Awan (from 2018)

Strength
SPLA: 150,000 (2015); Uganda: 5,000+ (2014)	12,523 (2015); 15,000 soldiers (2019); 1,800 police (2019)	SPLM-IO: At least 10,000 defectors Nuer White Army: 25,000 (2013); NAS: 20,000+ (NAS claim, 2017); SSPA: 15,000 (SSPA claim, 2017)

Casualties and losses
10,659 killed, 9,921 wounded (January–October 2014) (Uganda) 21 killed (by January 2014)	5 peacekeepers killed (by August 2015)	Unknown
- 190,000 violent deaths (April 2018); 193,000 non-violent war-related deaths (April 2018); 383,000 total deaths (April 2018)
- 1.5 million+ civilians had fled South Sudan and 2.1 million+ civilians internally displaced (as of 2017); Four Kenyan civilians killed.

The South Sudanese Civil War was a multi-sided civil war in South Sudan fought from 2013 to 2018 between government and opposition forces. The civil war caused rampant human rights abuses, including forced displacement, ethnic massacres, and killings of journalists by various parties. Since the war's end, South Sudan has been governed by a coalition formed by leaders of the former warring factions, Salva Kiir and Riek Machar. The country continues to recover from the war while experiencing ongoing and systemic ethnic violence.

In December 2013, President Kiir accused his former deputy Machar and 10 others of attempting a coup d'état. Machar denied trying to start a coup and fled to lead the Sudan People's Liberation Movement-in-Opposition (SPLM-IO). Fighting broke out between the Sudan People's Liberation Movement (SPLM) and SPLM-IO, igniting the civil war. Ugandan troops were deployed to fight alongside the South Sudanese government. The United Nations has peacekeepers in the country as part of the United Nations Mission in South Sudan (UNMISS).

In January 2014, the first ceasefire agreement was reached. Fighting continued and was followed by several more ceasefire agreements. Negotiations were mediated by IGAD, the African Union, the United Nations, China, the European Union, the United States, the United Kingdom and Norway; the "Compromise Peace Agreement" was signed in August 2015. Machar returned to Juba in 2016 and was appointed vice president. Following a second breakout of fighting within Juba, the SPLM-IO fled to the surrounding and previously peaceful Equatoria region. Kiir replaced Machar as First Vice President with Taban Deng Gai, splitting the opposition, and rebel in-fighting became a major part of the conflict. A rivalry between the President and the former army chief Paul Malong Awan also led to fighting. In August 2018, a ceasefire came into effect, and on 12 September 2018 the war officially ended with the signing of the Revitalized Agreement on the Resolution of the Conflict in the Republic of South Sudan (R-ARCSS). On 22 February 2020, rivals Kiir and Machar struck a unity deal and formed a coalition government.

By April 2018, it was estimated that about 400,000 people, 10.6% of which were children, had been killed in the war. This death toll includes notable atrocities, such as the 2013 Nuer massacre and the 2014 Bentiu massacre. Although both parties otherwise had supporters from across South Sudan's ethnic divides, there were strong tensions between the Dinka and Nuer, which were often violent. Kiir's Dinka ethnic group has been accused of attacking other ethnic groups and Machar's Nuer ethnic group has been accused of attacking the Dinka. More than 4 million people have been displaced, with about 1.8 million of those internally displaced, and about 2.5 million having fled to neighboring countries, especially Uganda and Sudan. Fighting in the agricultural heartland in the south of the country caused the number of people facing starvation to soar to 6 million, leading to the 2017 famine. The country's economy has also been devastated. In October 2017, the IMF reported that real income had halved since 2013 and inflation was more than 300% per annum.

== Background ==
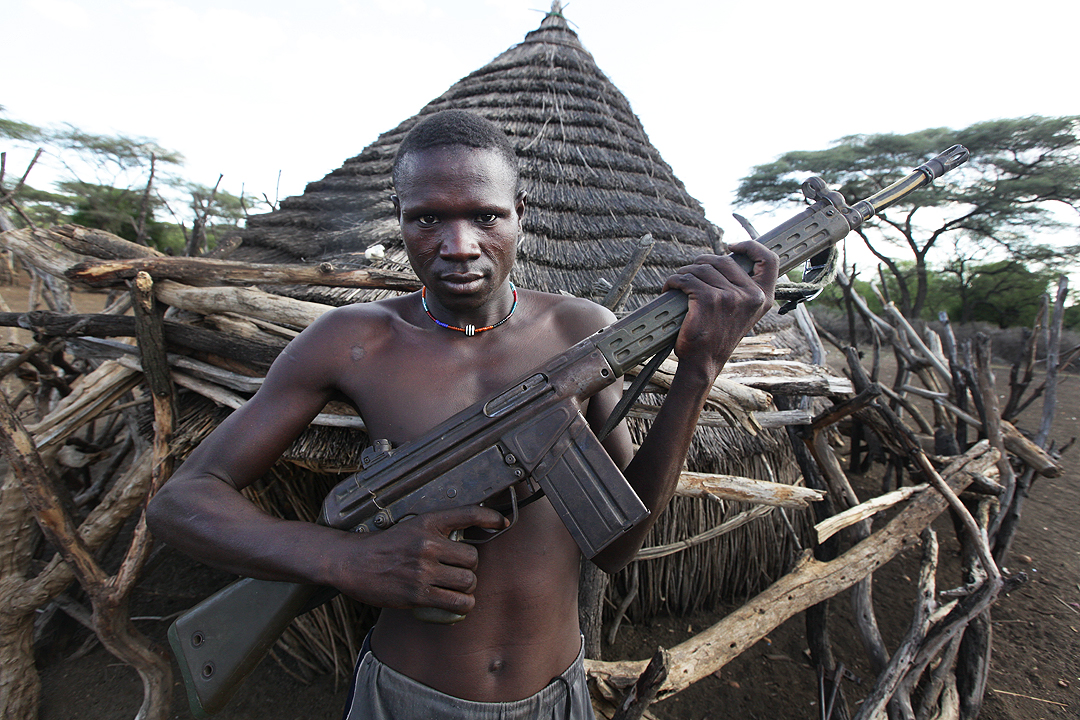
A South Sudanese man holding a HK G3, May 2011

=== Previous rebellions ===
The Comprehensive Peace Agreement signed on 9 January 2005 between the Sudan People's Liberation Movement (SPLM) and the Government of Sudan ended the Second Sudanese Civil War, which had started in 1983. Under the terms of the peace agreement, a Southern Sudan Autonomous Region was created and run by the SPLM with a promise that a referendum on independence would be held in 2011. During the six years period of autonomy, the desire for independence kept in-fighting within the SPLM in check. One consequence of the war's end was the oil fields in southern Sudan could be developed far more extensively than was possible during the war. Between 2006 and 2009, sales of oil brought in an annual average of US$2.1 billion to the Southern Sudan Autonomous Region. Disputes between leading personalities in the SPLM over how to appropriate the oil revenue led to recurring tensions. A system emerged during the autonomous period where SPLM leaders used the wealth generated by the oil to buy the loyalty of not only the troops, but the people at large, creating intense competition to control the oil.

In 2010, after a disputed election, George Athor led the South Sudan Democratic Movement in rebellion against the government. The same year, a faction of the South Sudan Democratic Movement, called the Cobra Faction, led by David Yau Yau rebelled against the government, accusing them of being prejudiced against the Murle. His faction signed a cease-fire with the government in 2011 and his militia was reintegrated into the army but he defected again in 2012. After the army's 2010 disarmament campaign which saw widespread abuses against the Shilluk people, John Uliny of the Shilluk people began a rebellion, leading the Upper Nile faction of the South Sudan Democratic Movement. Gabriel Tang, who led a militia allied to Khartoum during the Second Sudanese Civil War, clashed regularly with the SPLA until 2011 when his soldiers were reintegrated into the national army. In 2011, Peter Gadet led a rebellion with the South Sudan Liberation Army, but was reintegrated into the army the same year. Former rebellious militias were recruited into the South Sudan Liberation Army, a policy which has been described as "bad culture" and an incentive to rebel.

During the 2011 referendum 98% of voters voted in favour of independence, with South Sudan becoming an independent state on 9 July 2011.

=== President consolidates power ===
After rumors about a planned coup surfaced in Juba in late 2012, South Sudanese President Salva Kiir began to reorganize the senior leadership of his government,party, and military at an unprecedented scale. In January 2013, Kiir replaced the inspector general of the national police service with a lieutenant from the army and dismissed six deputy chiefs of staff and 29 major generals in the army. In February 2013, Kiir retired an additional 117 army generals with the move being regarded as a power grab by some. Kiir suggested that his rivals were trying to revive the rifts that had provoked infighting in the 1990s. In July 2013, Kiir dismissed Vice President Riek Machar, one-time leader of the Nasir revolt, along with his entire cabinet. Kiir suspended the SPLM Secretary-General Pagan Amum Okech and forbade him from leaving Juba or speaking to the media. The decrees elicited fears of political unrest, with Machar claiming that Kiir's move was a step towards dictatorship and announcing that he would challenge Kiir in the 2015 presidential election. He said that if the country is to be united, it cannot tolerate "one man's rule." In November 2013 Kiir disbanded all of the top-level organs of the SPLM party, including the Political Bureau, the National Convention and the National Liberation Council. He cited their failed performance and the expiration of their term limits.

=== Ethnic tension ===
For millennia, human society in the South Sudan region operated as a barter economy, with cattle being the primary medium of exchange. Cattle raids between different ethnic groups were an accepted and honorable way to acquire more cattle. However, there were widely accepted limits on the amount of violence permissible in cattle raids, and tribal elders would intervene if cattle raid violence became excessive. Furthermore, the antiquated weapons used in cattle raids were not likely to inflict mass casualties. During the Second Sudanese Civil War, the government in Khartoum, beginning in 1984, began a deliberate policy of "divide and rule" by arming young men with assault rifles and ammunition and encouraging them to engage in unlimited violence on cattle raids, hoping the resulting ethnic violence would cause so much disunity as to end the rebellion. This policy failed to end the rebellion, but it did cause the breakdown of accepted norms regarding violence on cattle raids and an increase in ethnic tensions between the peoples of southern Sudan. In 2010, Dennis Blair, the United States' Director of National Intelligence, issued a warning that "over the next five years,...a new mass killing or genocide is most likely to occur in southern Sudan." In 2011, there was fighting between the Murle and the Lou Nuer, mostly over cattle raids and abductions of children to be raised into the other tribe. The Nuer White Army released a statement stating its intention to "wipe out the entire Murle tribe on the face of the earth as the only solution to guarantee long-term security of Nuer's cattle". Notably, in the Pibor massacre, between 900 and 3,000 people were killed in Pibor. Although Machar and Kiir are both members of the SPLM, they stem from different tribes with a history of conflict. Kiir is an ethnic Dinka, while Machar is an ethnic Nuer.

== Course of the conflict ==
=== Initial incident ===
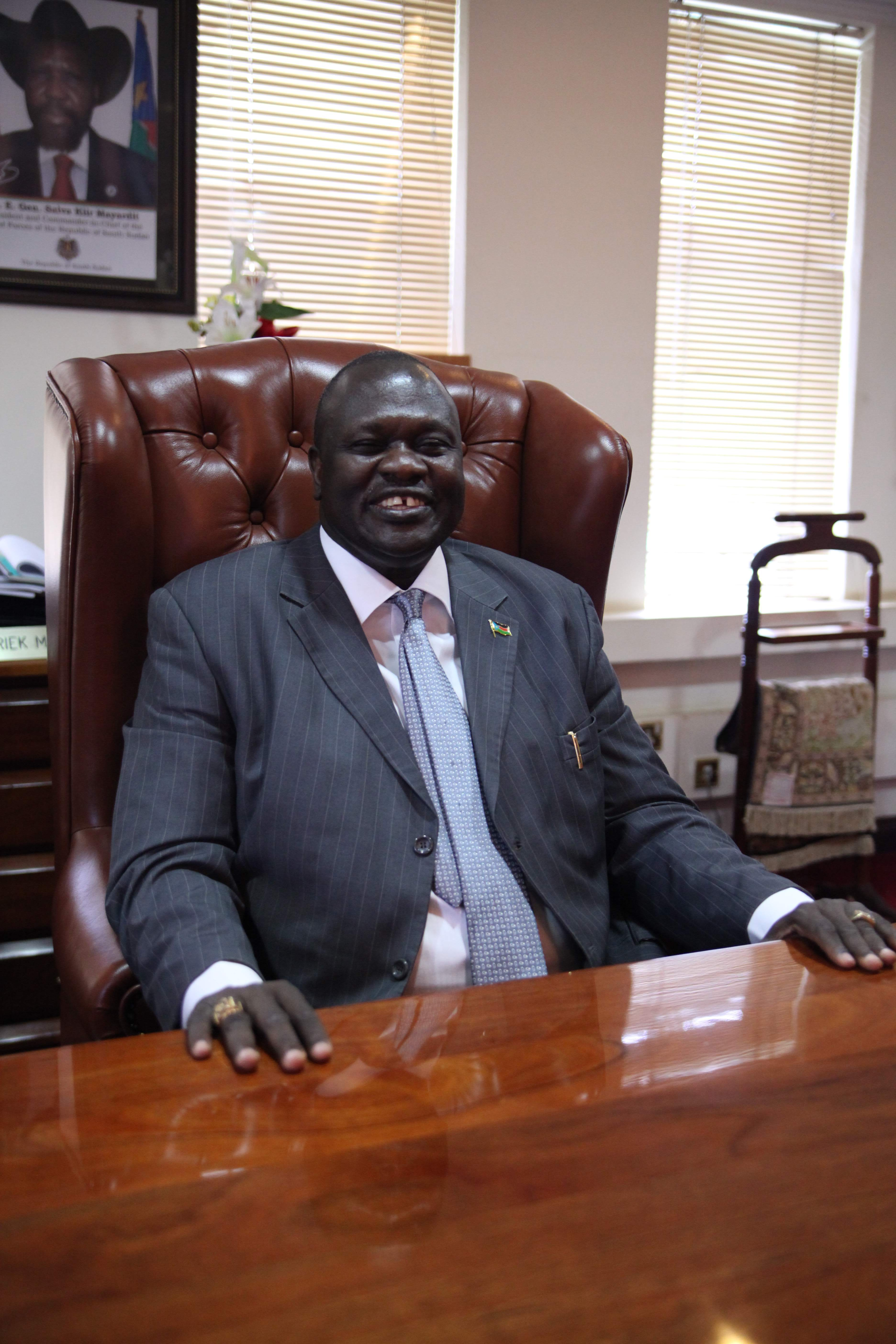
Riek Machar, founder of the Sudan People's Liberation Movement-in-Opposition

On 15 December 2013, opposition leaders Dr. Riek Machar, Pagan Amum and Rebecca Nyandeng voted to boycott the National Liberation Council meeting in the Nyakuron neighbourhood of Juba.

The Sudan Tribune reported clashes breaking out on 15 December in the Munuki neighbourhood of Juba between members of the presidential guard. Kiir also claimed that the fighting began when unidentified, uniformed personnel started shooting at a meeting of the SPLM. The military headquarters near Juba University was then attacked, with occasional fighting continuing to the next day. Heavy gunfire and mortar fire were reported on 16 December, and UNMISS announced that hundreds of civilians sought refuge inside its facilities. Military spokesman, Philip Aguer said that some military installations had been attacked but that "the army is in full control of Juba," that the situation was unlikely to deescalate, and that an investigation was under way. Several people were also injured during the fighting. Juba International Airport was closed indefinitely; Kenyan airlines Fly540 and Kenya Airways indefinitely suspended flights to Juba after the airport closed. A dusk-to-dawn curfew was imposed until further notice. State-owned SSTV went off-air for several hours. When it returned to broadcasting, it aired a message by President Salva Kiir. The dissident group was said to include Sudan People's Liberation Movement (SPLM) founder John Garang's widow, Rebecca Garang.

Former Minister of Higher Education Peter Adwok Nyaba said that on the evening 15 December after the meeting of the National Liberation Council had failed, Kiir told Major General Marial Ciennoung to disarm his soldiers of the "Tiger Battalion," which he did. Adwok then controversially claimed that the officer in charge of the weapons stores, opened them and rearmed only the Dinka soldiers. A Nuer soldier questioned this and a fistfight ensued which lead to more soldiers getting involved and raiding the stores and culminated in the Nuer soldiers taking control of the military headquarters. The next morning, Sudan People's Liberation Army (SPLA) reinforcements arrived and dislodged the mutineers. Adwok explained:

"Military doctrine dictates that once a contingent of mutinous troops have been dislodged, appeal is made for their surrender and then disarmed. Those who remained loyal (to the president) are also disarmed to prevent bad blood. The loyal troops of Tiger, hailing mainly from Warrap and Aweil, have not been disarmed. In fact, they are the ones rampaging Juba, looting and shooting to kill any Nuer in the residential neighbourhoods."

Adwok was placed on a list of wanted politicians, to which he said "this may be my last contribution, because, as I said, I'm waiting for the police in order to join my colleagues in detention." On Christmas Day, five days after his controversial publication, Adwok was arrested and held for two days. He was later detained at the Juba airport when attempting to leave the country. His passport was also confiscated.

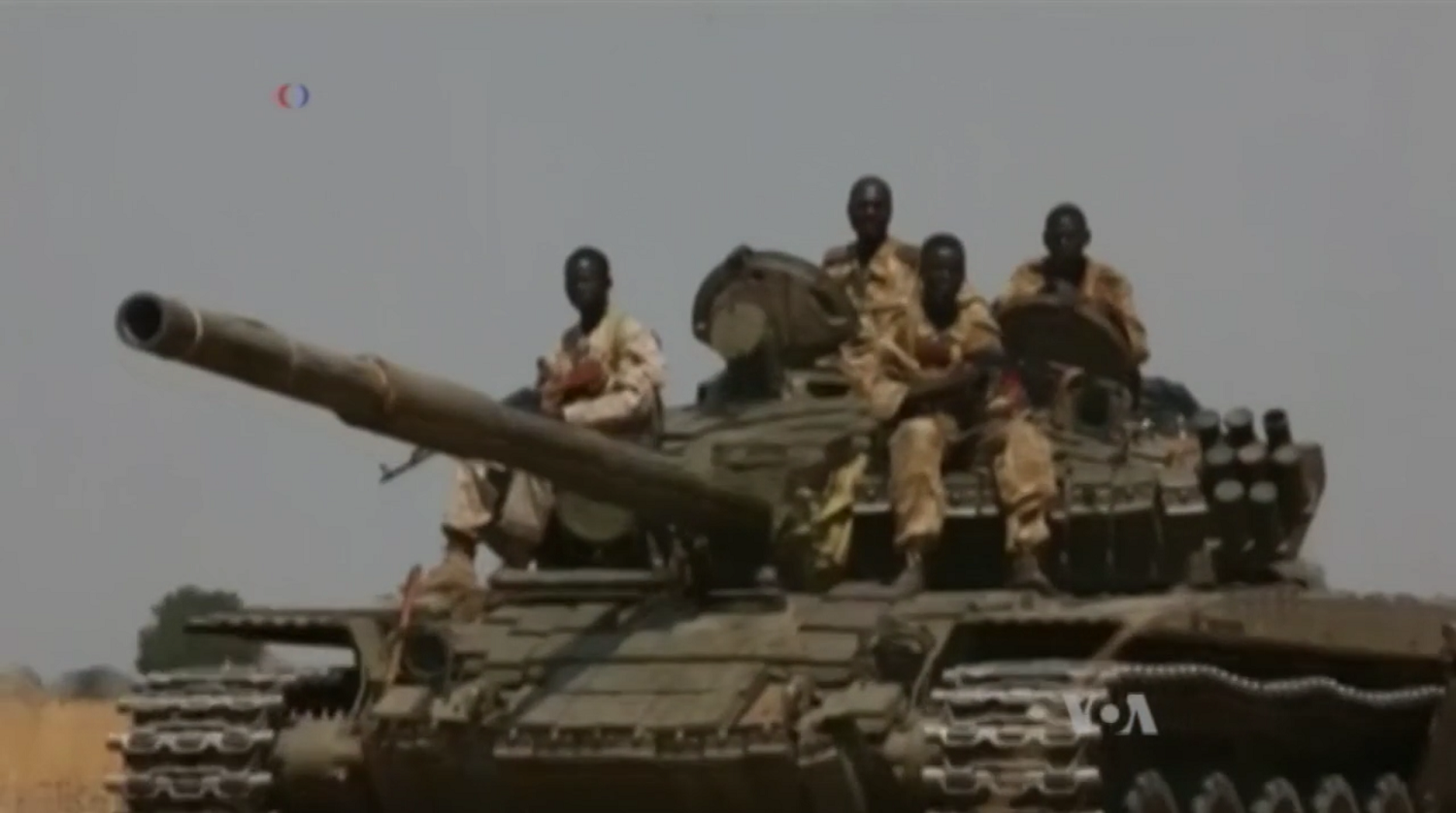
A T-72 of the Sudan People's Liberation Army (SPLA) during the civil war

Foreign Minister Barnaba Marial Benjamin claimed that those that were a part of the coup were "disgruntled" soldiers and politicians led by Machar and that at least ten people were confirmed to have been detained, seven were confirmed as former ministers including former Finance Minister Kosti Manibe and Pagan Amum was later reported to be held in house arrest. Other arrests included those of Kiir's critics. Information Minister Micheal Makuei Leuth claimed that Machar had left Juba with some soldiers and stolen cattle.

President Salva Kiir spoke on national television on 16 December, having abandoned his signature suit and stetson for military fatigues, and said, while surrounded by government officials, that the coup had been foiled and that it was orchestrated by a group of soldiers allied with the former vice president. On 21 December, the government announced its unconditional readiness to hold peace talks with any rebel group, including Machar In a Christmas message, Kiir warned of the fighting becoming a tribal conflict. Chief Whip and MP from Eastern Equatoria, Tulio Odongi Ayahu, announced his support for Kiir.

Machar spoke for the first time since the crisis began on 18 December in which he said he was not aware of any coup attempt, but instead blamed Kiir for fabricating the coup in order to settle political scores and target political opponents. He accused Kiir of inciting ethnic tensions to achieve his ends. He also said the violence was started by the presidential guard, which was founded by Kiir and told to report directly to him instead of the military. He refused to deny or acknowledge support for Gadet but that "the rebels are acting in the right direction." On 22 December, Machar said he wanted to be the leader of the country and that "his" forces would maintain control of the country's oil fields.

=== Beginning of rebellion (2013–2014) ===
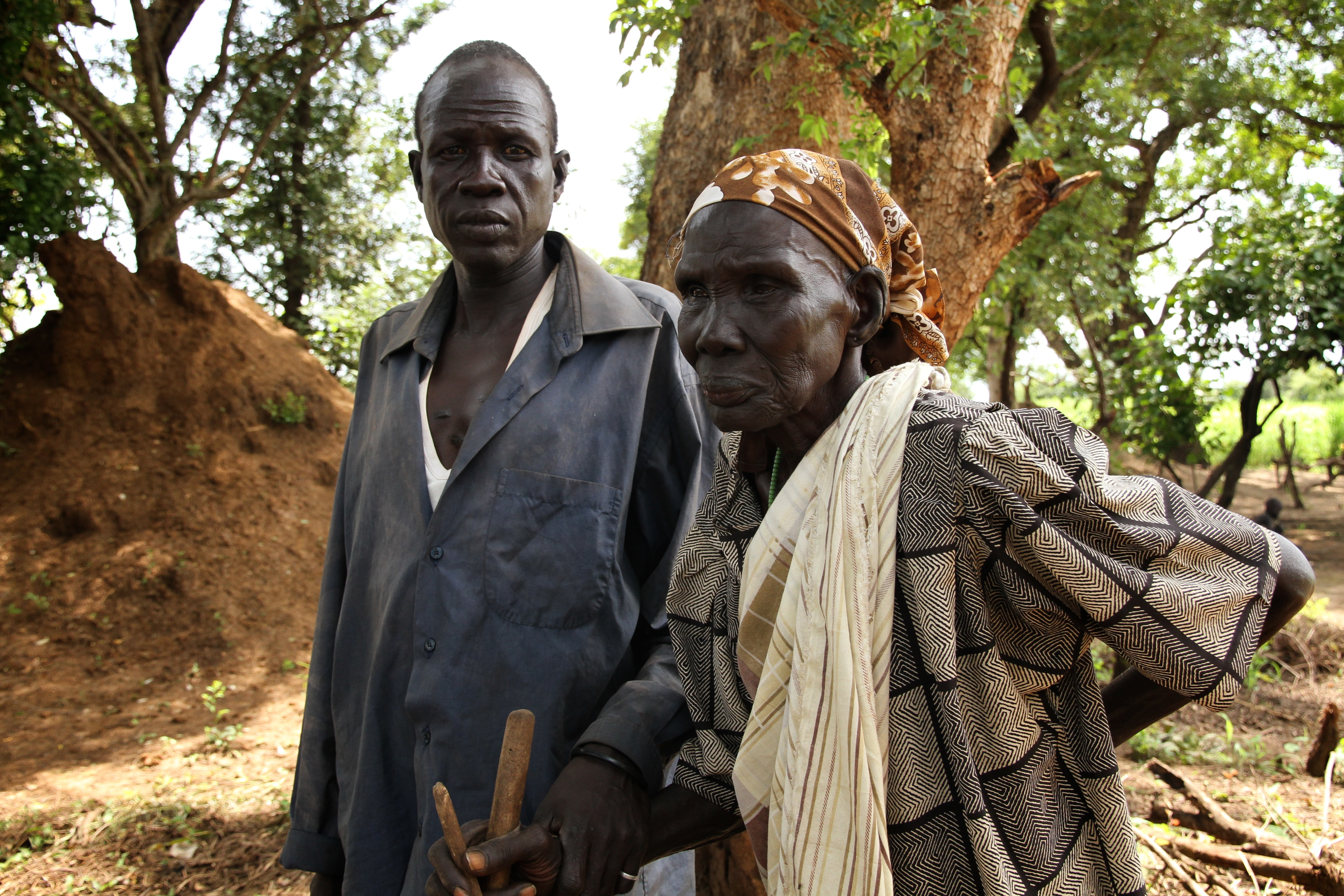
A South Sudanese mother and her son at a refugee camp in Gambela in 2014. Three other sons who also tried to escape the violence were killed.

The local Radio Tamazuj suggested UNMISS were absent from the streets in Juba and that president of the UN Security Council Gérard Araud, had announced that the peacekeepers would not intervene in the fighting. Human Rights Watch described an incident during the Juba conflict in which 200–300 Nuer men were collected, place in a room and then shot at, killing most of the men. The next day, witnesses reported seeing around 200 bodies being moved from a clinic in the Jebel area of Juba. A semblance of calm returned to Juba by 18 December, though there were unconfirmed reports of several students being killed by security personnel at Juba University.

The UN announced that thousands of people had sought refuge within its compounds with 13,000 people taking refuge in its two compounds in Juba. Two Indian peacekeepers were killed on 19 December whilst helping to protect 36 civilians in Akobo, Jonglei, when they were attacked by about 2,000 armed Nuer youths. The attack was condemned by the UN Secretary-General Ban Ki-moon. On 10 February 2014, one of the UN compounds in Juba was surrounded by armed government troops and policemen, who demanded that the UN surrender the Nuer civilians sheltering there.

About 200 employees of petroleum operators, of which the three largest were China National Petroleum Corp, ONGC Videsh and Petronas, sought refuge at an UN compound in Bentiu. This followed the deaths of 16 such workers: five workers at a field in Unity State on 18 December and the other 11 at the Thar Jath field the next day. Government soldiers then took control of the fields and said that production continued normally. The rebels had reportedly taken over at least some of the country's oil fields amidst fears of Sudan intervening in the country.

Pariang county in northern Unity is home to the Rueng Dinka—the only Dinka group in the state. Fighting broke out in Pariang on 20 December, when some SPLA troops defected to the rebels. On 24 December, an estimated 400 defectors moved southwards from Jaw, the SPLA's northernmost operating base, towards positions held by SPLA forces loyal to Koang Chuol. By 26 December, the SPLA claimed to have destroyed 37 rebel vehicles in Pariang county, which remained under their control.

Marines evacuate U.S. citizens from South Sudan, 3 January 2014

Following calls from the Government of South Sudan, Uganda deployed its troops to Juba to assist in securing the airport and evacuating Ugandan citizens. On 21 December a flight of three US Air Force V-22 Osprey aircraft en route to evacuate US nationals from Bor took small arms fire from the ground, injuring four Navy SEALs. South Sudan blamed the rebels for the incident. A second evacuation attempt by four UN and civilian helicopters succeeded in evacuating about 15 US nationals, Sudanese-Americans and those working in humanitarian operations, from the United Nations base in Bor on 22 December. Although the base was surrounded by 2,000 armed youths, a rebel commander had promised safe passage for the evacuation. In total 380 officials and private citizens as well as about 300 foreign citizens were flown to Nairobi. The United States military announced a repositioning of its forces in Africa to prepare for possible further evacuations as the United Nations warned of the planned strikes. Many of these reports have come from the hundreds of foreign oil company employees gathered at the airport to leave. Five Ugandan and ten Kenyan citizens were also evacuated from Bor and Juba. The Kenyan government said that there were 30,000 of its nationals in the country and that 10,000 had applied for emergency documents.

On 22 December 2013, U.S. and Nigerian envoys were on their way to Juba to try to negotiate a solution. The U.S. envoy to the country, Donald Booth, said that having spoken to Kiir, the latter was committed to talks with Machar without preconditions. Machar said that the rebel side was ready for talks that could possibly occur in Ethiopia. He said he wanted free and fair elections and that it is best if Kiir leaves. His conditions for talks were that his "comrades", including Rebecca Garang and Pagan Amum, be released from detention to be evacuated to Addis Ababa. Information minister Makuei said those involved in the coup would not be released and dismissed claims that the rebels had taken the major oil fields.

The Nuer White Army (flag above) joined the conflict on the side of the opposition.

Fighting had spread to Bor by 17 December, where three people had died and over 1,000 people sought refuge in the UN base. The situation escalated when around 2,000 soldiers led by Peter Gadet revolted and attacked the city of Bor on 18 December. The rebels quickly seized much of the settlement. Ethnically targeted violence was also reported and the Dinka feared a repeat of the Bor massacre. On 23 December, Aguer said the army was on its way to Jonglei and Unity to retake territory. On 24 December, The Government of South Sudan claimed to have recaptured Bor despite fighting still taking place in parts of the town. Most of Gadet and most of his forces had withdrawn. On 27 December, Machar condemned Ugandan interference and claimed Ugandan air forces bombed their positions in Bor. There was also tension at the UN compound in the city as armed fighters had entered it and about 17,000 civilians seeking protection were at the location. The UN also reported that their base was being reinforced with additional protective barriers, including the area hosting the displaced civilians. On 29 December, a UN helicopter spotted a group of armed youths 50 kilometres (31 miles) from Bor but could not confirm their numbers. On 30 December, South Sudanese government troops clashed with Nuer White Army militiamen and other rebel factions loyal to Machar near Bor. By 31 December, the rebels were close to reaching the center of Bor and by 2 January, Mayor of Bor, Nhial Majak Nhial said that the government had withdrawn from the city and Kiir declared a state of emergency in Unity and Jonglei states, where rebels controlled the capitals. On 4 January intense battles involving tanks and artillery were reported on the outskirts of Bor, which by this time had changed hands three times since fighting began. Rebels claimed that a South Sudanese army general has been killed in the fighting, as his convoy approaching Bor was ambushed. The SPLA brought large numbers of reinforcements bringing the total SPLA troops 25 km (16 mi) from Bor close to 2,000.

On 24 December, fighting was reported in Malakal, with Sudanese presidential spokesperson Ateny Wek Ateny claiming that the Upper Nile oil fields were far from Malakal and secure. On 27 December, the army said it had taken back full control of Malakal, the administrative center of Upper Nile, a state which supplied all of South Sudan's crude oil, after fighting shut down oil fields in other areas. By February 2014, the UN compound in Malakal housed around 20,000 people who had fled the conflict. The UNMISS reported that on 14 January heavy fighting broke out near the UN compound in Malakal with one civilian killed and dozens wounded during the battle. Civilians emptied out of the town, and at least 200 drowned when their overcrowded boat sank as they tried to flee across the Nile. On 15 January, fighting continued in the streets of Malakal with both sides claiming to control the town. On 18 February 2014, fighting between members of various ethnicities broke out within the UN Mission in the capital city of Upper Nile State, Malakal, resulting in ten deaths.

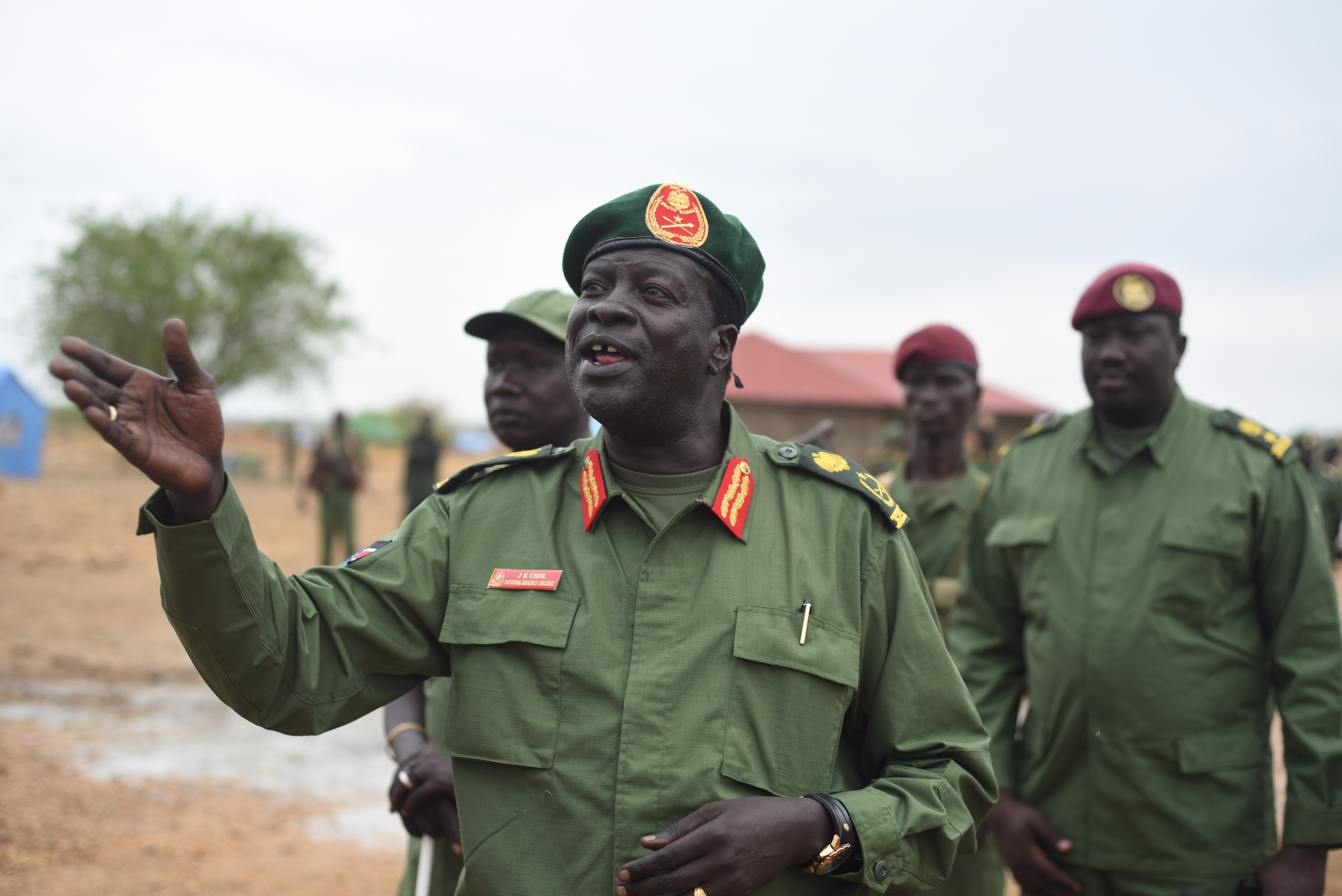
In December 2013, parts of the SPLA's 4th Division rebelled under the leadership of James Koang (pictured).

On 20 December commander of the SPLA 4th Division, James Koang, declared himself military governor of Unity State, his forces then clashed with those loyal to Kiir resulting in the forces loyal to Kiir retreating to the barraks in Bentiu. The next day, Koang announced allegiance to Machar and declared an 'interim government' of the state with state governor Joseph Nguen Monytuel fleeing Mayom county. The soldiers loyal to Kiir retreated to Abiemnom County and were reinforced by Western Bahr el Ghazal's 5th division and the Northern Bahr el Ghazal's 3rd division to take back Bentiu. South Sudan Liberation Movement (SSLA) militia forces, led by the Bul Nuer commander Matthew Puljang, decided to support them. By 27 December, a combined force of SSLA and SPLA seized Mayom, 90 kilometers from Bentiu, on 29 December. Peter Dak, the rebel commander in Mayom, announced that he fled the town on 7 January. Around 8 January 2014, the SPLA forces advanced on Bentiu, which had been mostly evacuated, securing the city on 10 January 2014.

=== Peace talks and rebel split (2014–2015) ===
The South Sudan Liberation Movement (flag above) joined the conflict on the side of the government.

In January 2014, direct negotiations between both sides, as mediated by IGAD, the African Union the United Nations, China, the EU, the US, the UK and Norway, began. South Sudanese troops retook Bor on 18 January and Malakal on 20 January. Government troops were assisted by Ugandan troops, against the wishes of IGAD who feared a wider regional conflict. Uganda announced they had joined the conflict in support of Kiir in January after previously denying it, having said the troops were only there to evacuate Ugandan nationals. On 23 January 2014, representatives of the Government of South Sudan and representatives of Riek Machar reached a ceasefire agreement in Ethiopia.

Three days later both sides accused each other of breaking the ceasefire agreement. The rebels accused the government of attacking the town of Leer and other rebel held positions and that the attacks were an attempt to sabotage the second round of talks scheduled for later in February. The rebels threatened to boycott the second round talks, demanding the release of four remaining political prisoners and the withdrawal of Ugandan forces. On February 18, the rebels attacked the strategic government-controlled town of Malakal and later captured it. The government claimed to have recaptured the town on the 20 March, with the rebels claiming that they had only withdrawn to the southern portion of the town. In April, rebels claimed once again to have seized Bentiu and by 19 April South Sudan's army admitted to have "lost communication" with commanders battling in Unity state. The 2014 Bentiu massacre occurred on 15 April in Bentiu when more than 400 civilians were killed mostly along ethnic lines after rebels took control of the town. Machar claimed his forces were not responsible. A mosque, hospital, and church were targeted where civilians had sought refuge from the fighting. After the fall of Bentiu, Salva Kiir replaced army chief James Hoth Mai with Paul Malong Awan.

The Greater Pibor Administrative Area (highlighted) created as part of a peace agreement between the government and the largely Murle rebel group, the Cobra Faction, in 2014

In May 2014, the government signed a peace agreement with the Murle-dominated Cobra Faction of the South Sudan Democratic Movement, led by David Yau Yau. As part of the agreement, a semi-autonomous area called the Greater Pibor Administrative Area was created to increase the minority populations within its borders and David Yau Yau was appointed chief administrator, equivalent to state governor. In February 2015, a largely Murle group, unhappy with the agreement with the government, split off from the Cobra Faction to form the Greater Pibor Forces and declared allegiance to Machar. One of their disagreements with the government was the alleged provoking of the Murle to fight against anti-government Nuer groups in Jonglei. In April 2016, Murle fighters in South Sudan crossed over to Gambela in Ethiopia and killed more than 200 people, stole 2,000 cattle and kidnapped more than 100 children from the Nuer tribe.

On 9 May 2014, President Salva Kiir and Riek Machar signed a second ceasefire agreement in Addis Ababa. Hostilities were to end in 24 hours and humanitarian corridors were to be opened while a permanent ceasefire was worked on. Hours after the ceasefire was to come into effect, both sides accused each other of violating the ceasefire. On 11 June 2014, both parties agreed to begin talks on the formation of a transitional government within 60 days and to a third ceasefire. However, the talks collapsed as both sides boycotted them, and by 16 June, the ceasefire was reported to have been violated. In August 2014, Kiir and leaders of South Sudan's neighbouring states signed a roadmap for the creation of a transitional government. Machar refused to sign, accusing the leaders of IGAD, of tilting the process in favour of Kiir. In November 2014, renewed the ceasefire agreement with IGAD mediators giving them 15 days to make a power-sharing deal and threatening sanctions if they do not. This ceasefire down 24 hours later with fighting in the north. In January 2015, rival factions of the SPLM signed a reunification agreement in Arusha, Tanzania, but fighting continued. In February 2015, Kiir and Machar signed a document on "Areas of Agreement" to work towards the establishment of a transitional government. The talks later collapsed and fighting broke out in March.

Arms dealers sold weapons to both sides. A series of networks emerged to sell weapons with the principal sources of arms being Egypt, Uganda, Ukraine, Israel and China. In July 2014, the Chinese arms manufacturer Norinco delivered a shipment of 95,000 assault rifles and 20 million rounds of ammunition to the government. The government asked Norinco if with was possible for them to set up a factory in South Sudan, with Norinco declining. American arms dealer, Erik Prince, sold three Russian-made Mi-24 attack helicopters and two L-39 jets to the government for US$43 million. The aircraft were flown by Hungarian mercenaries with one of the mercenaries, Tibor Czingali, posting photographs on his Facebook account of bullet holes in his jet. In Spain, police arrested Franco-Polish arms dealer, Pierre Dadak, at his luxury villa in Ibiza. Documents found at the villa showed that Dadak had a contract with the rebels to sell them 40,000 AK-47 assault rifles, 30,000 PKM machine guns and 200,000 boxes of ammunition. In July 2014, the government's National Security Service signed a contract worth US$264 million with a Seychelles-based shell company to buy 50,000 AK-47s, 20 million bullets and 30 tanks. The demand for weapons had a disastrous impact on the elephant population as the rebels kill elephants to sell their tusks on the black market to earn money to buy arms. The number of known elephants in South Sudan declined from 2,300 in 2013 to 730 in 2016.

John Uliny, leader of a government-aligned militia had his forces switched sides to oppose the government after Kiir announced plans to replace South Sudan's 10 states with 28 states, a move which Uliny viewed as taking land from the Shilluk. On 16 May 2015, Uliny's militia and elements of the SPLM-IO captured Upper Nile's capital, Malakal, as well as Anakdiar and areas around Kodok. His Shilluk militia group now called itself the 'Agwelek forces'. The group said they want to run their affairs independently from others in Upper Nile State, and the SPLM-IO backed away from claims that it was in charge of Uliny's group and stated that Uliny's interests simply coincides with theirs. The SPLM-IO said they understood that the Shilluk community wanted a level of independence and that was why they created Fashoda State and appointed Tijwog Aguet, a Shilluk, as governor.

On 11 August 2015, Gabriel Tang, Peter Gadet and former SPLM-IO logistics chief Gathoth Gatkuoth, announced that they and other powerful commanders had split from Riek Machar, and rejected the ongoing peace talks, announcing that they would now fight Riek Machar's forces in addition to government forces. Gatkuoth stated he wishes for a president who was neither Dinka nor Nuer and intended to register his group as a political group called the "Federal Democratic Party" and that their forces would be called the "South Sudan National Army".

=== Compromise Peace Agreement and second Juba clashes (2015–2016) ===
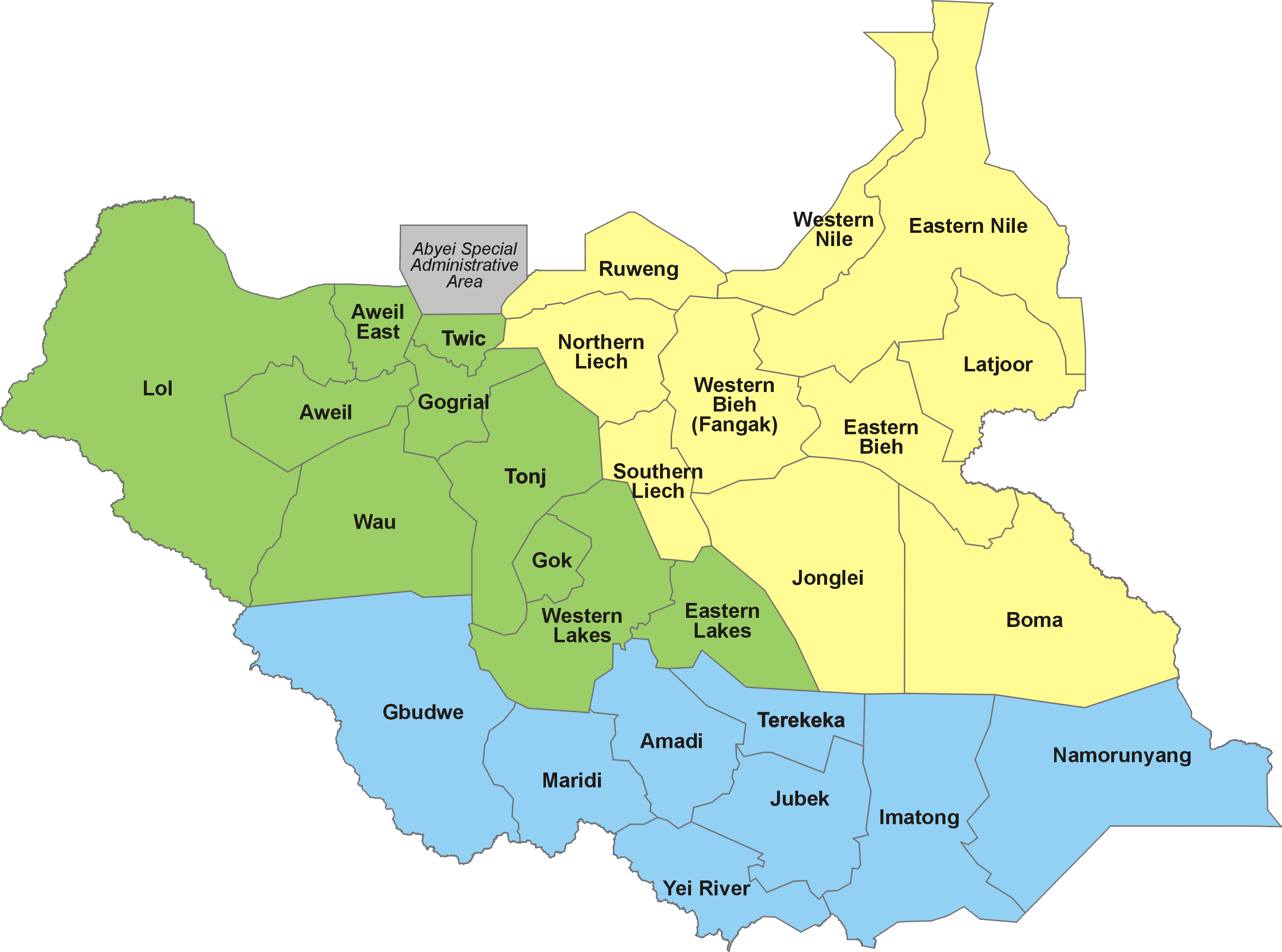
In December 2015, Kiir increased the number of states from 10 to 28 and appointed governors considered loyal to him.

In late August 2015, Salva Kiir signed a peace agreement previously signed by Riek Machar called the "Compromise Peace Agreement" mediated by IGAD and other mediators. The agreement would restore Riek Machar as vice-president. The agreement established the Joint Monitoring and Evaluation Commission (JMEC) responsible for monitoring and overseeing implementation of the agreement. On 20 October 2015, Uganda announced that it would voluntarily withdraw its soldiers from South Sudan, in accordance to that peace agreement. In January 2016, David Yau Yau dissolved the Cobra Faction of the South Sudan Democratic Movement and joined the SPLM. In January Gathoth Gatkuoth joined with the government but was dismissed by his Federal Democratic Party for doing so. In April 2016, as part of the peace deal, Machar returned to Juba with troops loyal to him and was sworn in as vice-president.

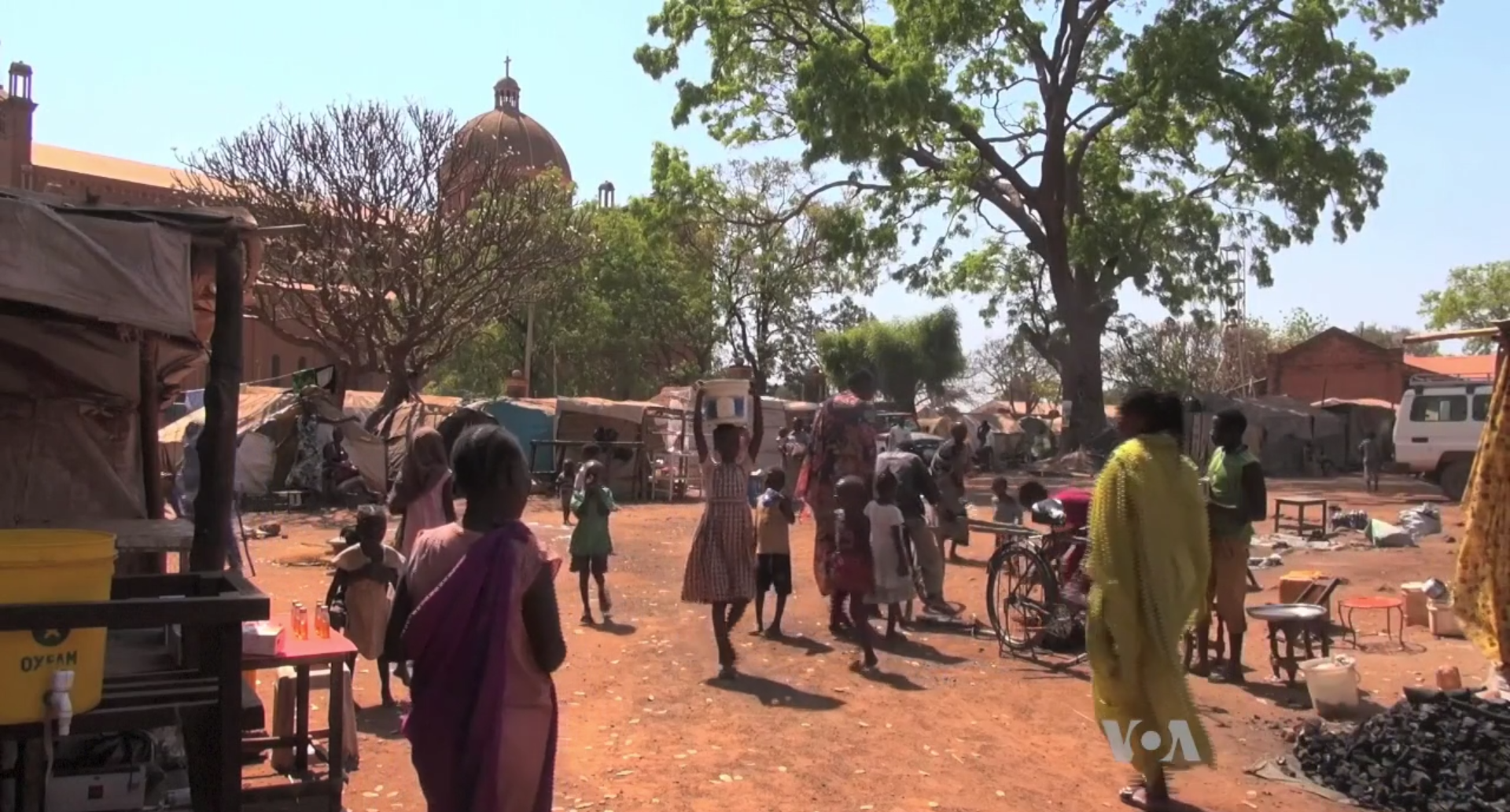
Refugee camp at Wau town's cathedral, where many Fertit have sought protection during the 2016–19 Wau clashes

On Christmas Eve 2015, Salva Kiir announced he was going forward with a plan to increase the number of states from 10 to 28 and then, five days later appointed new governors who were considered loyal to him. The new borders give Kiir's Dinkas a majority in strategic locations. Some observers felt that the government was holding on to the peace deal to maintain international aid while backing campaigns to increase Dinka control over land and resources traditionally held by other groups. As the predominantly Shilluk Agwelek forces joined, in July 2016, with the SPLM-IO, which entered the peace agreement with the government, some Shilluk felt dissatisfied. The predominantly Shilluk Tiger Faction New Forces formed in October 2015 and were led by General Yohanis Okiech. They rejected joining the SPLM-IO or the peace agreement and called for the restoration of the original 1956 borders of the Shilluk territories.

By this point, the Dinka militia leaders loyal to Kiir had grown rich by confiscating cattle (still the main currency unit in rural areas) from the Nuer, giving them a vested interest in keeping the Nuer down. In South Sudan, ownership of cattle is closely tied to a sense of masculinity and a man who does not own cattle is not only poor, but also felt to lack manliness. This loss of cattle led Nuer men, to join rebel groups. Furthermore, many of the Dinka leaders, now flushed with cattle, began to push into the province of Equatoria to seize the rich farmland for their cattle herds, causing the local farmers to fight back. The British journalist Peter Martell wrote the war had started out as a conflict within the elite over control of the oil revenue, but had "evolved into anarchy, opportunism, and revenge" as the violence had acquired a momentum of its own with multiple clan leaders raising their own militias to battle over control of the cattle herds and land, struggles fought with little reference to either Kiir or Machar.

Notably, the war ceased to be an ethnic struggle, instead becoming a clan conflict with Dinka and Nuer clans professing loyalty to Kiir and Dinka and Nuer clans professing loyalty to Machar. One clan leader who raised a militia, James Koach, who was nominally loyal to Machar told Martell in 2016: "I don't care what deal they sign in Juba. The deals are with the government and where is the government? They mean nothing to us and make no difference here. They took our wives and killed our children. My family's gone, so what do I care if I live or die? They took our cows. You who come from outside don't know what that means. Our cows are everything, because without them how do we survive? They are trying to wipe us out, to remove us from the earth". By 2016, it was estimated that there were at least 20,000 child soldiers fighting in South Sudan, and many experts on the subject such as the retired Canadian General Roméo Dallaire who campaigns against the use of child soldiers warned that having so many child soldiers would have a long-term negative impact on South Sudan.

When Dinka cattle herders, allegedly backed by the SPLA, occupied farmland, Azande youth rose up into militias mostly with the Arrow Boys, whose leader Alfred Karaba Futiyo Onyang declared allegiance to SPLM-IO and claimed to have occupied parts of Western Equatoria. A new rebel faction calling itself the South Sudan Federal Democratic Party (different from but related to the larger similarly named rebel faction led by Peter Gadet, Gabriel Chang and Gathoth Gatkuoth), made up mostly of Lotuko people formed during this time due to growing perceptions of mistreatment by the "Dinka" government and took over an SPLA outpost in Eastern Equatoria. In February 2016, Dinka SPLA soldiers attacked a UN camp targeting Nuer and Shilluk who accused the government of annexing parts of their ancestral land. About a year after the peace agreement was signed, groups of Dinka youth and the SPLA targeted members of the Fertit in Wau, killing dozens and forcing more than 120,000 to flee their homes. As result, local Fertit tribal militias and groups allied with the SPLM-IO rose in rebellion, causing heavy clashes in the formerly relatively peaceful Wau State, which continued for months.

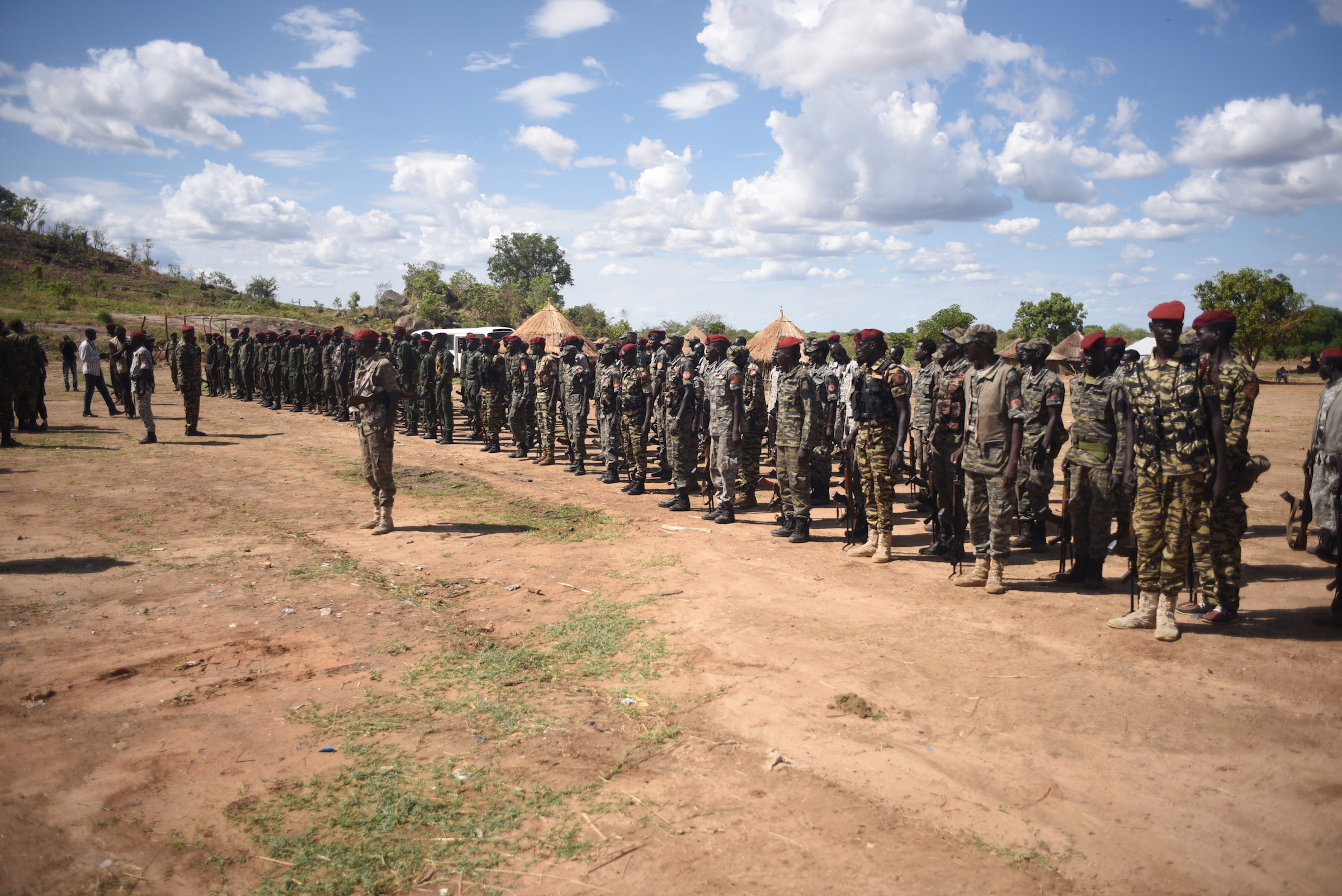
SPLA soldiers near Juba, shortly after the clashes in the city between followers of Riek Machar and Salva Kiir

Violence erupted in July 2016 after an attack outside of where President Kiir and Riek Machar were meeting in Juba. Fighting spread throughout the city. Over 300 people were killed and over 40 people were injured, including civilians. In the following week, 26,000 fled to neighboring Uganda. The Indian Air Force evacuated Indian citizens from the country under Operation Sankat Mochan. A spokesman for Riek Machar announced that South Sudan was "back to war" and that opposition forces based in areas of Juba had been attacked by forces loyal to the President. Helicopters and tanks were reported in several parts of Juba on 10 July. Gun battles broke out near the airport and a UN base forced the airport to close for safety reasons. Kiir and Machar ordered a ceasefire after days of intense violence. Machar fled Juba after the clashes.

After a 48-hour ultimatum given by Kiir for Machar to return to Juba to progress with the peace agreement talks passed, the SPLA-IO in Juba appointed lead negotiator Taban Deng Gai to replace Machar and the government accepted him as acting vice-president. Machar said any talks would be illegal because Machar had previously fired Gai. Machar, with assistance from the UN, went into exile, first to Kinshasa then to Sudan and then to South Africa, where he was allegedly kept under house arrest.

After Machar's flight, Kiir sent his soldiers to rob the Central Bank of South Sudan, and put up $5 million US dollars stored in the central bank's vaults as a reward to anyone who could kill Machar. Kiir's spokesman admitted to what had been done, claiming it was justified under the circumstances.

=== Rebel infighting and splits among ruling Dinka (2016–2017) ===
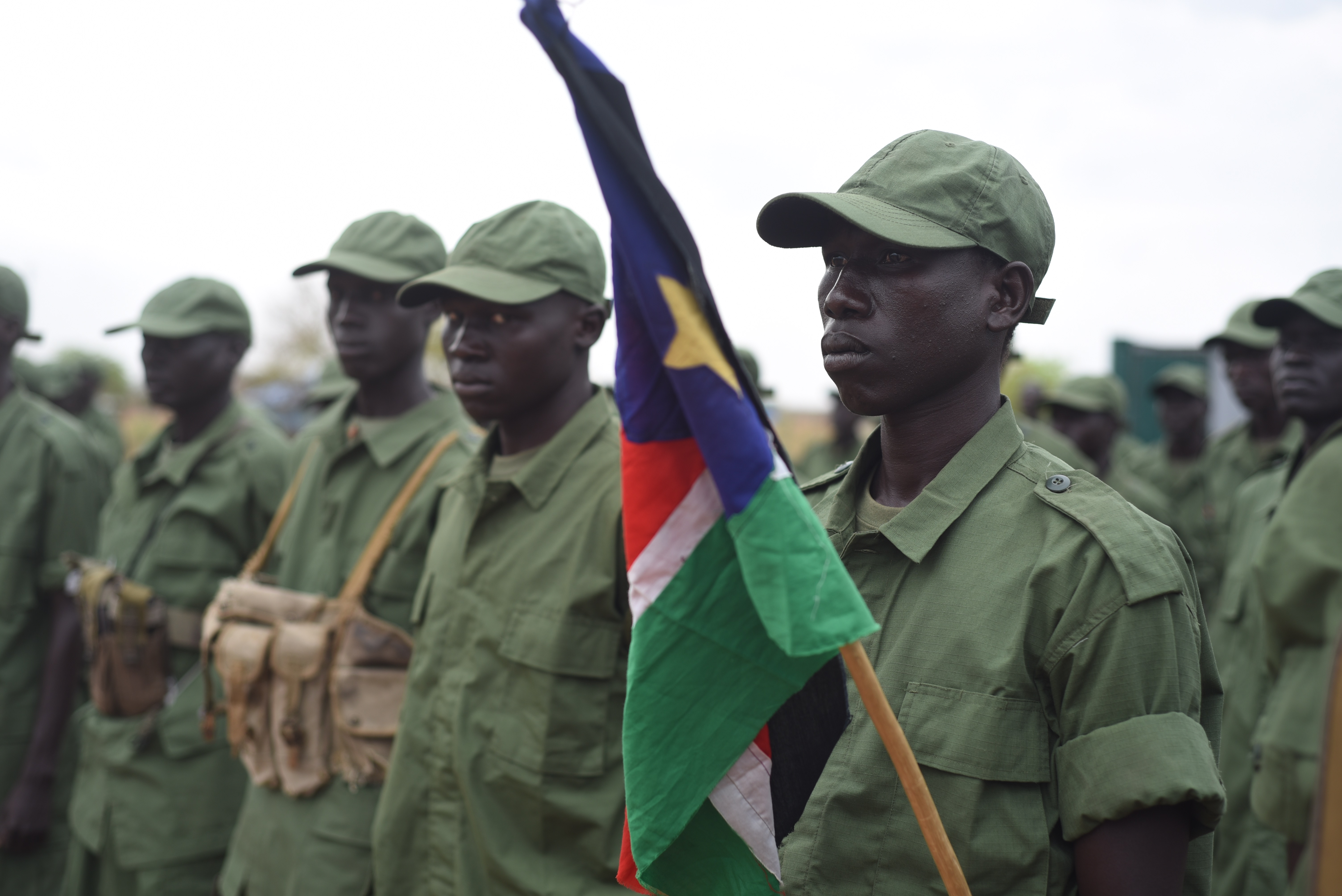
Rebel soldiers of the SPLA-IO in April 2016

In September 2016, Machar called for armed struggle against Kiir and in November, he said SPLM-IO would not participate in a workshop organized by the JMEC, saying that the peace agreement needed to be revised. In September, Lam Akol, leader of the largest opposition party, Democratic Change, announced a new faction called the National Democratic Movement (NDM) to overthrow Kiir. Yohanis Okiech, who led the largely Shilluk Tiger Faction New Forces, which split from Uliny's Agwelek forces, joined the predominantly Shilluk NDM as deputy chief of general staff. In the same month, the Cobra Faction of the South Sudan Democratic Movement, now led by Khalid Boutros declared war against the government.

On the international front, the African Union, after the Juba clashes, backed plans for the deployment of troops from regional nations with a strong mandate similar to that of the United Nations Force Intervention Brigade that swiftly defeated the M23 rebels in the Democratic Republic of Congo as UN troops within the country have struggled to protect civilians. In August 2016, the UN Security Council authorized such a force for Juba. The government initially opposed the move, claiming a violation of sovereignty. With a resolution threatening an arms embargo if it blocked the new deployment, the government accepted the move with conditions such as the troops not being from neighboring countries, claiming they have interests at stake. They also accepted a hybrid court to investigate war crimes. The US pushed for an arms embargo and sanctions on Machar and army chief Paul Malong Awan through the Security Council, but it failed to pass in December 2016. After an independent report into UNMISS's failure to protect civilians in the Juba clashes, Secretary-General Ban sacked the commander of the UN force Lieutenant General Johnson Mogoa Kimani Ondieki in November, the general's native Kenya declared that it would pull out of the key role it was playing in the peace process and withdrew its more than 1,000 peacekeepers from UNMISS before sending the troops back in with the start of the new UN secretary general's tenure. On 30 April 2017, the first batch of the Regional Protection Force arrived under Brigadier General Jean Mupenzi of Rwanda with the first phase of troops arriving in August.

Among regional powers, Kiir met, in January 2017, with Egyptian president Abdel Fattah el-Sisi who also met with Kiir's ally Ugandan President Museveni. Egypt had previously rejected the Grand Ethiopian Renaissance Dam that Egypt said would diminish its share of the Nile river and Ethiopian Prime Minister, Hailemariam Desalegn had accused Egyptian institutions of supporting terrorist groups in Ethiopia. The SPLM-IO alleged that a "dirty deal" was struck between Kiir and Egypt against Ethiopia while Kiir denied any diplomatic row. The SPLM-IO accused the Egyptian Air Force of bombing their positions on 4 February 2017 while Egypt denied it. As a result of Sudan's effective counterinsurgency strategy in the War in Darfur, the biggest rebel faction, the Justice and Equality Movement (JEM), retreated to South Sudan and became involved in mercenary and criminal activities. The SPLM-IO accused JEM as well as another rebel group in Sudan, the SPLM-North of joining the conflict on the side of Juba.

Since the July clashes, the fighting spread from the Greater Upper Nile to include the previously safe haven of Equatoria, where the bulk of the SPLM-IO forces went for shelter from the clashes in Juba. As Equatoria is the agricultural belt of the country, the number of people facing starvation soared to 6 million. In November 2016, SPLM-IO claimed to have taken of the towns Bazi, Morobo and Kaljak. While the rebels were mostly in retreat in the Upper Nile front, they had gained ground on the Equatorian front where the SPLA was mostly restricted to its garrisons. This was attributed to local self-defence militias becoming increasingly integrated and the depopulation of towns resulting in the army having fewer supplies while the rebels were adapted to the bush. However, after the fall of the main rebel headquarters of Pagak in the summer, their southern headquarters in Lasu fell on 18 December 2017. In late May, Kiir declared a unilateral ceasefire, which was taken with suspicion by others as it came after the late April government offensive that retook much territory and before the rainy season that would have reduced fighting. Three days after the government retook Lasu it signed another ceasefire with the rebels.

The other major front of the conflict remained the Greater Upper Nile, where government forces mostly fought John Uliny's SPLA-IO allied Agwelek forces. In a study of casualties up to April 2018, the deaths from violence peaked between 2016 and 2017. In October 2016, the rebels attempted to take Malakal and by January 2017, fighting there had led to civilians deserting the country's second-largest city. Whilst fighting in the Bahr el Ghazal region, pro-government militia Mathiang Anyoor attacked Wau killing up to 50 civilians in April 2017. In the same month, the SPLA-IO captured Raja, the capital of Lol State, while state governor Hassan claimed the city was immediately retaken. A counteroffensive by the government starting in late April 2017 reversed most rebel gains, captured the capital of the Shilluk kingdom, Kodok, from Uliny and closed in on Pagak, which had been the SPLA-IO headquarters since 2014. In July 2017, the SPLA along with forces loyal to Taban Deng Gai took over the rebel-held town of Maiwut. The government took over Pagak in August 2017 while the SPLA-IO still held territory in traditional Nuer areas of Panyijar Country in Unity state and rural areas of Jonglei and Akobo state. SPLA-IO forces under Machar counterattacked Taban Deng Gai's force, in an attempt to retake Pagak.

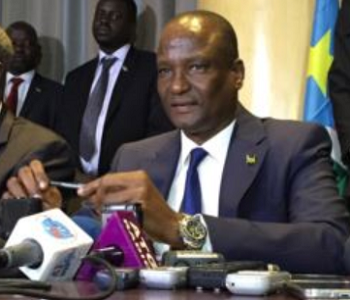
Taban Deng Gai (2016)

An additional dimension of the conflict developed with fighting between the opposition loyal to Machar and those supporting Taban Deng, largely within the Nuer-majority former state of Unity. Observers felt that Kiir had given up on negotiations by talking with Taban Deng instead of Machar during the peace talks, as Taban was seen by many in the opposition as a traitor. As part of the "National Dialogue" initiated by Kiir in December 2016 where any former rebels who return to the capital would be given amnesty, about a dozen SPLM-IO officials defected to the government in January 2017. Gabriel Tang, who was one of the generals to have defected from Machar during the peace talks in 2015, now allied with Lam Akol's largely Shilluk NDM and became its chief of staff. In January 2017 Tang was killed in clashes with the SPLM-IO allied Agwelek forces led by John Uliny, a move the SPLM-IO described as a warning to rival rebel factions. Two days later, Uliny's forces ambushed and killed Yohanis Okiech, destroying the Tiger Faction New Forces.

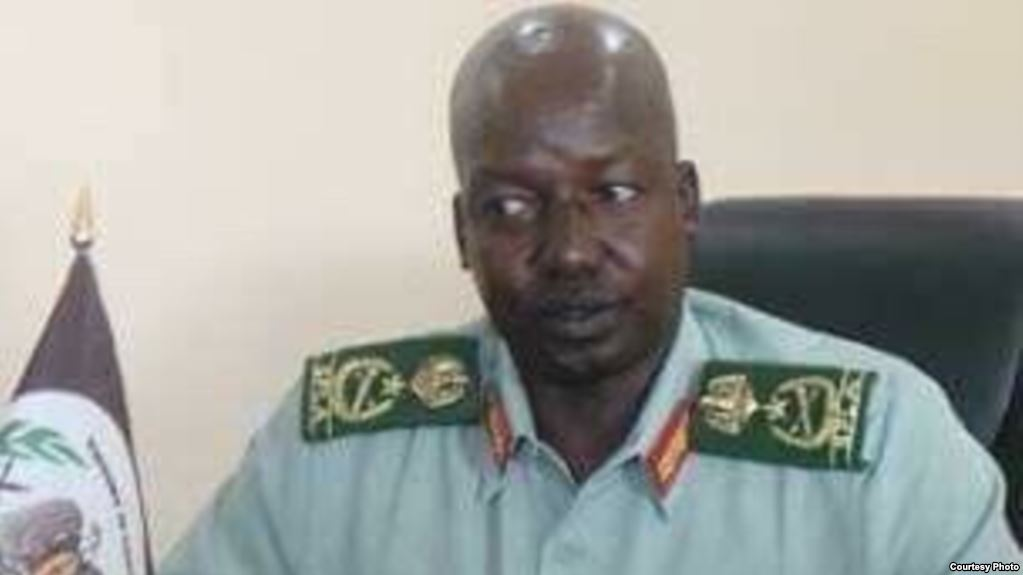
General Thomas Cirillo of the National Salvation Front (NAS)

In February 2017, Deputy head of logistics, Lieutenant General Thomas Cirillo Swaka resigned, accusing Kiir of ethnic bias. This led to a series of high ranking resignations, including minister of Labour Lieutenant General Gabriel Duop Lam who also pledged allegiance to Machar. Swaka formed a new rebel group called the National Salvation Front (NAS) in March 2017. In March 2017, Cirillo, a Bari from Equatoria, got additional support as the SPLM-IO's Western Bahr al Ghazal commander, Faiz Ismail Futur, resigned to join the NAS while there are reports of six SPLM-IO shadow governors from Equatoria defecting to the NAS. In the same month, head of the Cobra Faction Khalid Boutros dissolved the Cobra Faction and merged it with the NAS and claimed opposition groups were in consultation to unite their ranks. In July 2017, John Kenyi Loburon, the SPLA-IO's commander of Central Equatoria state defected to the NAS, claiming favoritism towards Nuers in the SPLA-IO and then, as an NAS general in the same month, fought with the SPLA-IO in Central Equatoria in the first clashes between the two groups. By November 2017, the NAS had captured areas in Kajo Keji from the SPLM-IO, before both groups were routed by the government. With broad support at its inception, by 2018, many had come to view the NAS as "the Bari".

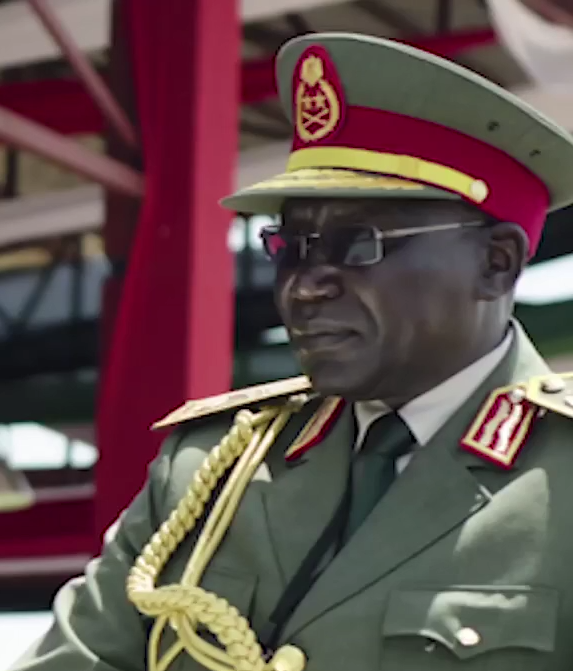
Paul Malong Awan, former SPLA army chief, rebelled against the government in April 2018

Cracks were appearing along clan lines among the ruling Dinka. Kiir's Dinka of Warrap were in a feud with the Dinka of Paul Malong Awan's Aweil, who contributed the bulk of the government's fighting force in the war. Around this time, the largely Dinka South Sudan Patriotic Army (SSPA) was formed in Northern Bahr el Ghazal, with the backing of powerful figures such as former presidential advisor Costello Garang Ring and allegedly Malong Awan. In May 2017, Kiir reduced the power of the chief of staff position and fired its powerful Dinka nationalist Malong Awan and replaced him with General James Ajongo Mawut, who was a Luo. Awan left Juba with most of his Mathiang Anyoor militia while other militia members reportedly joined the SSPA. By the end of 2017, the SSPA had claimed to have captured territory around Aweil and was seen as one of the biggest threats to Juba. Awan was accused of plotting a rebellion and was detained but then released following pressure from the Dinka Council of Elders, a Dinka lobbying group. SPLM-IO rebels who were loyal to Malong Awan raided Juba in January 2018. In April of that year, Awan announced the launch of a rebel group named South Sudan United Front (SS-UF), which claimed to push for federalism.

=== 2018 peace agreement and continuing conflicts ===
==== Ceasefire and pre-transitional period (2018–2020) ====
By March 2018, nine opposition groups, including the NAS, the NDM of Lam Akol, the FDP of Gabriel Chang, the SSPA of Costello Ring and the SSLM—but notably not including the SPLM-IO—had joined to form the South Sudan Opposition Alliance (SSOA) to collectively negotiate with the government.

The United States put additional pressure on Juba by successfully passing an arms embargo on South Sudan in July 2018 through the UN Security Council, following their failure to do so in 2016, with Russia and China abstaining from voting this time. Additionally, with neighboring Sudan facing economic troubles and relying on revenue from transporting oil from South Sudan, the Sudanese government, with a mix of incentives and coercion, brought Kiir and the SPLA-IO to hold talks in Khartoum. In June 2018, they signed another ceasefire where they agreed to form a transitional government for the 36 months leading to national elections, to let African Union and IGAD peacekeepers deploy in South Sudan and to have state boundaries be drawn by a commission chaired by a non-South Sudanese; this ceasefire was violated just a few hours after coming into effect, when pro-government forces attacked rebels in Wau State. The SPLM-IO protested when the Parliament, where the Kiir's party holds a majority of seats, extended the President's term and that of other officials by three years. However, they eventually agreed to share power in what was called the "Revitalised transitional government of national unity (R-TGoNU)" with Machar to be one of five Vice Presidents and the 550 seat parliament to be divided with 332 going to Kiir's faction, 128 to Machar's group and the rest to other groups. An SSOA faction led by the NAS's Thomas Cirillo rejected the deal citing their small share in the power sharing agreement. As part of amnesty offered to groups following the peace deal, in August 2018, Brigadier General Chan Garang, claiming to lead a group of rebel soldiers from Malong's SS-UF, came back to the government along with 300 rebel soldiers in what was seen as a weakening of SS-UF. In September 2018, Kiir signed a peace deal with Machar formally ending the five-year civil war. Celebrations in Juba happened on 31 October 2018; however, there were criticisms that the peace deal failed to address the underlying issues of the conflict–the concentration of power in the hands of the president– and that the status quo will continue to produce violence. As part of the agreement, Machar was supposed to return to Juba in May to become a vice president again; citing security concerns, he asked for an extension of six months, which was accepted by Kiir. Six months later, both sides agreed to delay the formation of a transitional unity government by 100 days. The most contentious issue delaying the formation of the unity government was whether South Sudan should keep 32 or return to 10 states. On 14 February 2020, Kiir announced South Sudan would return to 10 states in addition to three administrative areas of Abyei, Pibor and Ruweng, and on 22 February Riek Machar was sworn in as first vice president for the creation of the unity government. The dissolution of parliament in order to bring a new parliament that shares power with the rebel groups, as called for by the 2018 peace deal, occurred in May 2021 after much delay.

The NAS became the main antagonist of the government, clashing with the government in the Central and Western part of Equatorial province starting in January 2019, leading to about 8,000 people fleeing Yei State. The NAS and the FDP also alleged being attacked by the SPLM-IO in Upper Nile State. The government continued to import arms. In August 2019, three rebel groups who were not signed up to the peace agreement—that of Cirillo's, whose rebel group was now known as South Sudan National Democratic Alliance (SSNDA), the SS-UF of Paul Malong and the Real Sudan People's Liberation Movement (R- SPLM) of Pagan Amum, resolved to unite their activities under "United South Sudanese Opposition Movements" (SSOMA). In January 2020, the Community of Sant'Egidio mediated a peace declaration in Rome between the SSOMA and the South Sudanese government.

==== Transitional period (2020–present) ====
In August 2021, Simon Gatwech Dual, made the Kitgwang Declaration where he declared himself the new leader of the SPLM-IO. Later in the month, clashes between forces loyal to Machar and Dual led to both sides reporting dozens of deaths. In February 2025, Gatwech signed a peace agreement with president Kiir in which Gatwech's group would be integrated into the South Sudan People's Defence Forces.

Disarmament campaigns led by the government led to resistance, with clashes killing more than 100 people in two days in north-central Tonj in August 2020. Localized inter-ethnic conflict reduced during the civil war but escalated in the last few years. It was argued that political elites bound by the deal have instead channeled weapons to community militias as a proxy war while others argued the power vacuum caused by the change in number of states is what led to the violence. While cattle raiding has been going on for years, some residents stated militias were targeting civilians more such as in one attack that killed 287 people in Uror County in May 2020.

In March 2025, the White Army attacked seized Nasir in the 2025 Nasir clashes killing an army general and attacking a UN helicopter killing a UN crew member. The government responded with the help of intervention from Ugandan soldiers. In December 2025, a coalition of rebel groups, including the White Army and those loyal to Machar, captured more areas of Jonglei.

While the Nuer White Army was largely independent and decentralized, the government accused Machar of being behind the attacks. Government forces entered Machar's residence in Juba and arrested him. This raised fears of a return to civil war and the UN reported that approximately 300,000 people had fled South Sudan in 2025, with about half of these refugees going to Sudan. The SPLM-IO declared that Machar's arrest invalidated the 2018 peace deal, while the government insisted that it was still valid. Foreign Policy wrote that the deal had been deteriorating amid escalating conflict between the Dinka and Nuer, and was effectively ended by Machar's de facto removal from power. The United Nations Mission in South Sudan has stated that the reported arrest "might lead the country to the brink of civil war".

Earlier in 2022, the Nuer White Army had razed Shilluk villages before the government intervened with attack helicopters. In 2025, John Uliny's Shilluk rebel group, the Agwelek Forces, agreed to integrate his forces into the national army.

===== Jonglei clashes (2025–present) =====
In January 2026, the government launched operation Enduring Peace to take back territory lost in Jonglei from the White Army and ordered civilians, non-government organisations and UN peacekeepers in three counties to evacuate. The United Nations stated that they would not comply. John Uliny and his forces were deployed in this operation and he was filmed ordering his troops to not spare civilians. By March 2026, the government claimed to have captured Akobo.

== Atrocities ==
=== Attacks on civilian centers ===
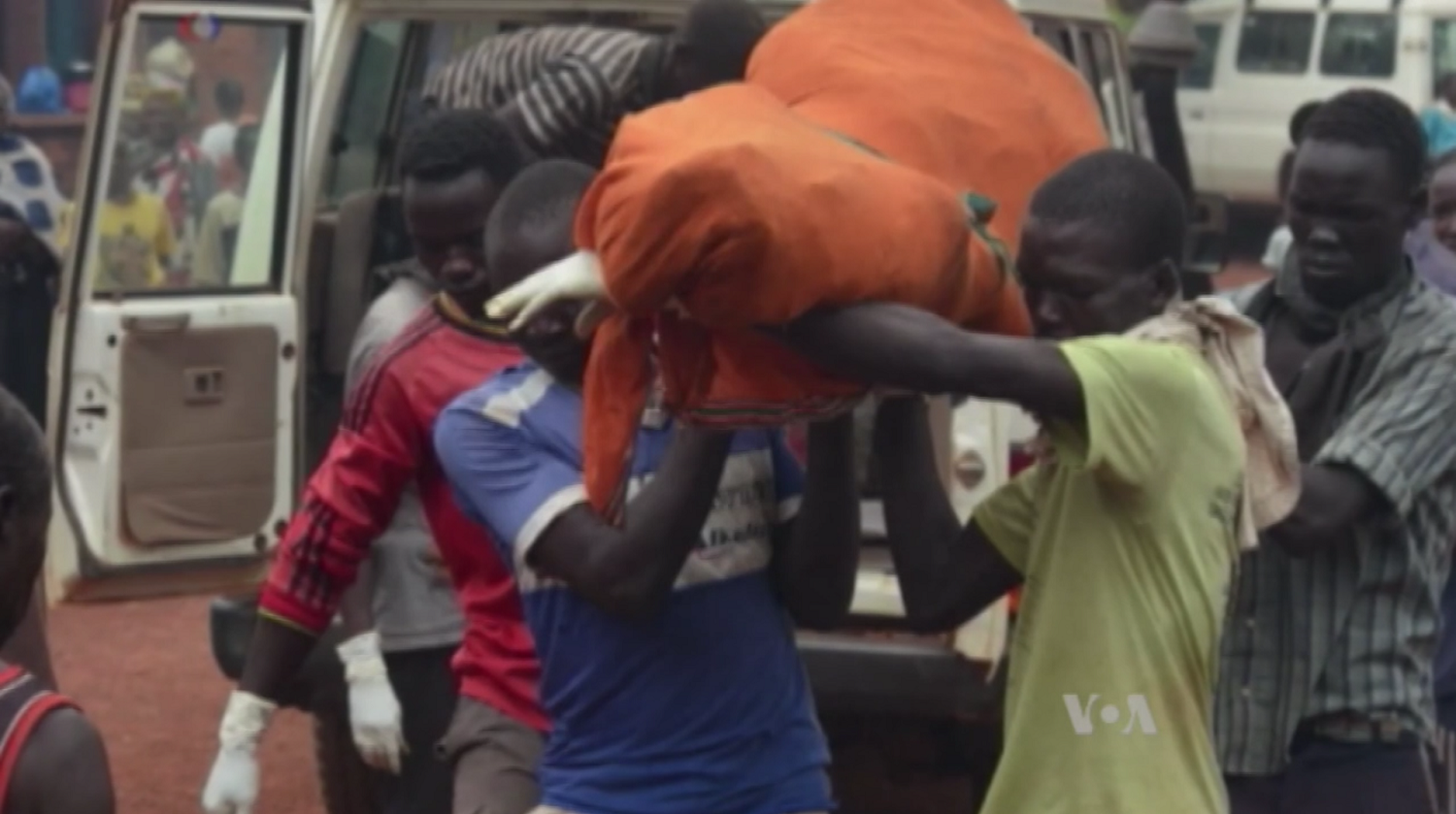
A civilian casualty of the 2016 Juba clashes is carried to a makeshift grave.

The government was accused by the US and aid groups among others of using starvation as a tactic of collective punishment for populations that supported the rebels by intentionally blocking aid.

Kiir's spokesman, claimed to a news conference, that rebel forces went into the hospital in Bor and killed 126 out of 127 patients. Apparently an elderly man was blind and the rebels spared him. On 31 January 2014 in violation of the ceasefire agreement, government forces attacked Leer in Unity State, forcing 240 Staff and patients of Doctors Without Borders in Leer to flee into the bush. Thousands of civilians fled to the bush. Doctors Without Borders lost contact with two thirds of its staff formerly located in Leer. It is believed that the town was attacked by government troops as it is the home of former Vice President Riek Machar. On 18 April, UN said that at least 58 people were killed and more than 100 others wounded in an attack against one of its bases in South Sudan sheltering thousands of civilians. On 17 April 2014, 58 people were killed in an attack on the UN base in Bor. Forty-eight of those killed were civilians, while 10 were among the attackers. UN Secretary-General Ban Ki-moon emphasised that any attack on UN peacekeepers constituted "a war crime", while the UN Security Council expressed "outrage" at the attack. In late 2016, in a government attack on Yei, three villages were destroyed with 3,000 homes burned in a single village.

Amnesty International claimed the army suffocated more than 60 people accused of supporting the opposition to death in a shipping container.

=== Ethnic cleansing ===
There were ethnic undertones to the conflict with the SPLM and SPLA, which has been accused of being dominated by the Dinka. A Dinka lobbying group known as the "Jieng Council of Elders" was often accused of being behind hardline SPLM policies. While the army used to attract men from across tribes, during the war, the SPLA had largely been constituted of soldiers from the Dinka stronghold of Bahr el Ghazal, and the army was often referred to within the country as "the Dinka army". Many of the worst atrocities committed were blamed on a group known as "Dot Ke Beny" (Rescue the President) or "Mathiang Anyoor" (brown caterpillar), while the SPLA claim that it is just another battalion. Immediately after the alleged coup in 2013, Dinka troops, and particularly Mathiang Anyoor, were accused of carrying out pogroms, assisted by guides, in house to house searches of Nuer suburbs, while similar door to door searches of Nuers were reported in government held Malakal. About 240 Nuer men were killed at a police station in Juba's Gudele neighborhood. During the fighting in 2016 and 2017 in the Upper Nile region between the SPLA and the SPLA-IO allied Upper Nile faction of Uliny, Shilluk in Wau Shilluk were forced from their homes and Yasmin Sooka, chairwoman of the Commission on Human Rights in South Sudan, claimed that the government was engaging in "social engineering" after it transported 2,000 mostly Dinka people to the abandoned areas. The king of the Shilluk Kingdom, Kwongo Dak Padiet, claimed his people were at risk of physical and cultural extinction. In the Equatoria region, Dinka soldiers were accused of targeting civilians on ethnic lines against the dozens of ethnic groups among the Equatorians. Adama Dieng, the U.N.'s Special Adviser on the Prevention of Genocide, warned of genocide after visiting areas where there was fighting in Yei. Khalid Boutros of the Cobra faction as well as officials of the Murle-led Boma State accuse the SPLA of aiding in attacks by Dinka from Jonglei state against the Boma state, and soldiers from Jonglei captured Kotchar in Boma in 2017.

The SPLM-IO is predominantly Nuer and its head, Machar, had previously committed the Bor massacre of mostly Dinka civilians in 1991. In 2014, the Bentiu massacre occurred when Bentiu was recaptured by rebels April 2014 and 200 people were killed in a mosque. Rebels separated the people and picked out those from opposing ethnic groups who they then executed.

=== Child soldiers ===
Since the conflict began, more than 17,000 children were used in the conflict, with 1,300 recruited in 2016.

=== Sexual violence ===
Reported incidents of sexual violence rose 60% in 2016, with Mundri in Equatoria's Amadi State being called the epicenter of the problem. A UN survey found that 70% of women who were sheltering in camps had been raped since the beginning of the conflict, with the vast majority of rapists being police and soldiers, and that 80% had witnessed someone else getting sexually assaulted. The SPLA were reported to have recruited militias and young men in Unity state to take back rebel-held areas. They were given guns and their pay was what they could loot and the women they could rape. Martell described the rampant sexual violence as not incidental to the war, but an integral and central part of the strategies of both sides, as "a tool for ethnic cleansing, as a means of humiliation and revenge". Nor were foreign aid workers safe, with gunmen belonging to Kiir's Tiger Force stormed an UN relief camp at the Terrain Hotel on 11 July 2016, killed the journalist John Gatluak for being a Nuer, and proceeded to gang-rape five foreign aid workers as a "punishment" for foreign criticism of Kiir. The UN peacekeepers from China who were supposed to be guarding the Terrain Hotel camp did nothing, despite being only a three-minute walk away from the hotel. The UN's Special Envoy for Sexual Violence, Zainab Bangura, reported that nowhere in the world had she had ever seen a place with worse sexual violence than South Sudan. The same study also reported that rape was not only common against women and children, but also against men, though the reluctance of men to admit that they had been raped made it difficult to place a precise number on the cases of male rape.

=== Violence against UN and foreign workers ===
It has been argued that with increased tension with the UN and outside powers over the government's actions there was a new shift in violence by the government against foreign peacekeepers, aid workers and diplomats. NGOs are viewed with suspicion, with the Minister of Cabinet Affairs claiming "most of the [humanitarian] agencies are here to spy on the government." During the 2016 Juba clashes, 80 to 100 South Sudanese troops entered the Terrain hotel facility and gang raped five international aid workers, with nearby peacekeepers from China refusing to help the victims. In July, soldiers ransacked a World Food Programme warehouse, stealing enough food to feed 220,000 people for a month, worth about $30 million. In July, a rocket-propelled grenade was fired near a UN peacekeepers' vehicle with two Chinese peacekeepers dying after the government refused passage to a clinic sixteen kilometres (10 mi) away. In December 2016, two staff members of the Norwegian Refugee Council were expelled from the country without a formal explanation. In the deadliest attack on aid workers, six aid workers were killed in an ambush on 25 March 2017 bringing the number of aid workers killed since the start of the war to at least 79.

Violence came from the rebel side as well. On 26 August 2014, a UN Mi-8 cargo helicopter was shot down, killing three Russian crew members, and wounding another. This occurred nine days after rebel commander Peter Gadet threatened to shoot down UN aircraft, which he alleged were transporting government forces.

== Casualties ==
=== Mortality ===
During the first two days of fighting after 15 December, reports indicated that 66 soldiers had been killed in clashes in Juba, and at least 800 injured. By 23 December, the number of dead had likely surpassed 1,000, while an aid worker in the country estimated that the death toll was most likely in the tens of thousands. The International Crisis Group reported on 9 January 2014 that up to 10,000 people were estimated to have died. In November 2014, the International Crisis Group estimated the death toll could be between 50,000 and 100,000. A senior SPLA officer stated in November 2014 that the number of government soldiers killed and wounded topped 20,000, with 10,659 soldiers killed from January to October 2014 and 9,921 seriously wounded, according to a report by Radio Tamazuj. By March 2016, after more than two years of fighting, some aid workers and officials who did not want to speak on the record said the true figure might be as high as 300,000. A study by the London School of Hygiene and Tropical Medicine, published in April 2018 claimed that about 383,000 people are conservatively estimated to have died as a result of the war, while the actual number may be considerably higher, with 190,000 deaths directly attributed to violence and most of the deaths having been in Jonglei, Unity and Equatoria.

Two Indian UN peacekeepers were killed on 18 December when their base was stormed by rebels, and three US military Osprey aircraft were fired upon leading to four American service personnel being wounded. On 21 January 2014 Ankunda said that 9 Ugandan soldiers died in a rebel ambush at Gemeza a week before, and 12 others had been killed in total since 23 December.

South Sudanese made up the largest contingent among the Refugee Olympic Team, who competed under the Olympic Flag (above).

=== Displaced people ===
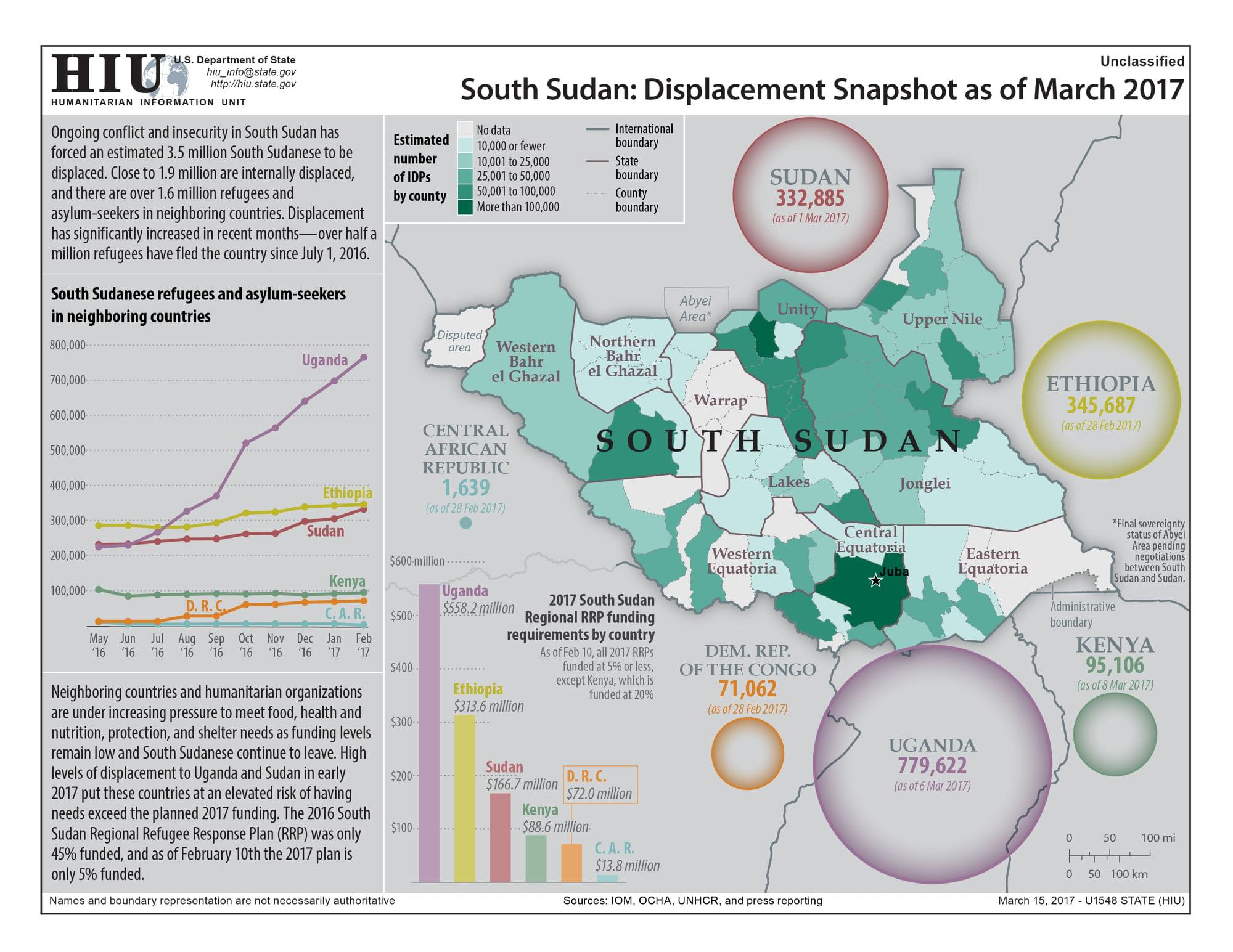
Map showing the displacement of South Sudanese civilians due to the civil war as of March 2017

More than 4 million people have been displaced, with about 1.8 million internally displaced and about 2.5 million having fled to neighboring countries, especially Kenya, Sudan, and Uganda. This was the world's third-largest refugee population after Syria and Afghanistan. About 86% of the refugees were women and children. Uganda, which took more refugees in 2016 than all of those who crossed the Mediterranean into Europe, has had a notably generous policy. Refugees are allowed to work and travel and families get a 30-metre by 30-metre plot of land to build a home with additional space for farming. In just six months since being built, the Bidi Bidi Refugee Settlement in Uganda became the single largest refugee settlement on earth. However, the Ugandan government is seen as an ally of Kiir's crackdown on rebels, although with an increasing refugee population, Uganda has pressured Kiir to make peace. The largest contingent of the Refugee Olympic Team at the 2016 Summer Olympics came from South Sudan, including its flag bearer.

=== Starvation ===
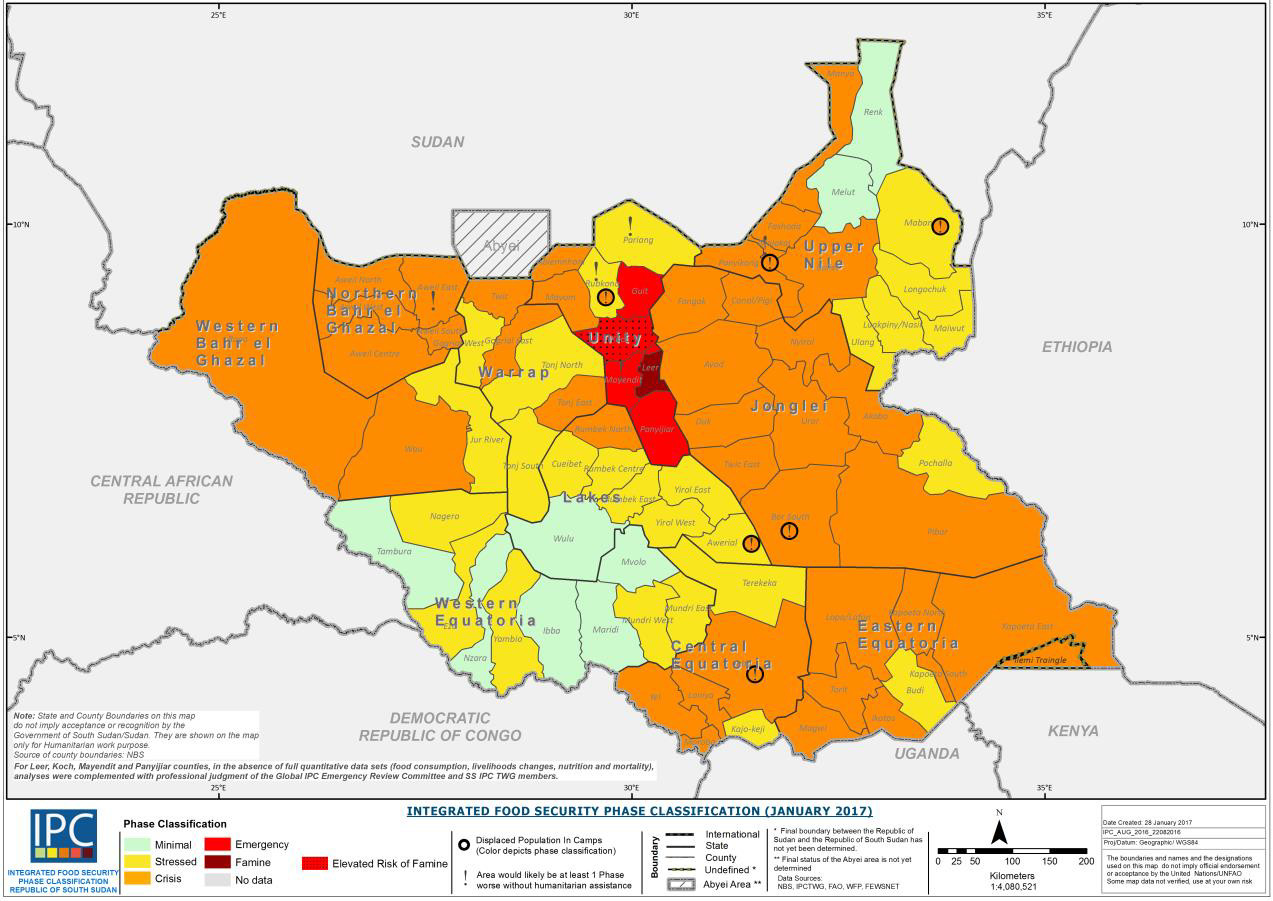
January 2017 map with phase classifications from "minimal" to "famine"

After the second Juba clashes, fighting intensified in the Equatoria region. As this is the agricultural heart of the country, the number of people facing starvation in the already food insecure nation soared to 6 million. In February 2017, famine was declared in Unity state by the government and the United Nations, the first declaration of famine anywhere in the world in six years. Days after the declaration of famine, the government raised the price of a business visa from $100 to $10,000, mostly aimed at aid workers, citing a need to increase government revenue.

In late 2020, with continued fighting and the impact of the COVID-19 pandemic as well as massive flooding, a report by international food security experts reported that five counties are on the brink of starvation and one county, Western Pibor, is in likely famine, meaning that at least 20% of households are facing extreme food gaps and at least 30% of children are acutely malnourished. In 2021, a "famine likely" announcement was made as not enough information was available to give a definite declaration of famine.

== Foreign involvement ==
=== Kenya ===
In 2018, Adama Dieng, the U.N. secretary-general's special adviser for the prevention of genocide accused Kenya and Uganda of funding the South Sudanese Civil War. According to Dieng "large quantities of weapons and ammunition were flowing into South Sudan through Kenya and Uganda". The Kenyan government denied the accusations stating "The allegations by the senior UN official insinuating Kenya’s complicity in trafficking large quantities of weapons and ammunition into South Sudan, are not only unfortunate and misguiding, but lack facts".

=== Israel ===
Israel has trained and sold weapons and surveillance systems to South Sudan after its independence in 2011, despite an arms embargo by the UN on the entire country. Israeli-made weapons, including ACE assault rifles were seen used by South Sudanese soldiers. Israel claims that these weapons were sold before the civil war occurred and that they have ceased selling offensive weapons in early 2014. These same rifles were used in December 2013 Nuer massacre. Other rifles like the Micro Gali was reported to have been sold to Uganda in 2007, but the Ugandan government transferred those weapons to South Sudan without informing Israel.

In response to a meeting with a UN panel of experts after a UN report documented Israeli-made weapons in South Sudan, Israel assured that it had stopped selling offensive weapons. Despite this, Israel continues to sell defensive equipment. The supplied defensive equipment includes communications interception equipment, which has been used to eavesdrop and arrest opponents, including the targeting of journalists. In June 2015, Israel welcomed South Sudanese officials to their Tel Aviv weapons expo.

In 2017, a group of 54 Israeli activists filed a petition to the Israeli High Court seeking criminal investigation into Israel’s export of arms to South Sudan. The goal was for more transparency on the arms deals that may have been involved in the conflict. A gag order was put on the petitions and the case. Freedom of information requests over the years regarding Israeli arms deals, contracts and training for South Sudan and related countries have been denied by the courts, ruling that this information was kept private from the public in order to protect the security of the nation.

== Participants ==
=== Government allied ===
- Sudan People's Liberation Movement (SPLM)
- Sudan People's Liberation Army (SPLA)
- South Sudan Liberation Movement (SSLM) – While the war was often viewed as a conflict between the Dinka-dominated government and other ethnicities, the Nuer-dominated SSLM allied with the government and helped take back Bentiu from the Nuer-dominated SPLM-IO in 2013.

=== Rebel groups ===
- (South Sudan) Sudan People's Liberation Movement-in-Opposition (SPLM-IO)
- Nuer White Army – The Nuer White Army is a militant Nuer organization originally formed to defend Nuer cattle herds and for cattle rustling particularly against the Murle people. During the Second Sudanese Civil War, they joined the breakaway faction of the SPLM led by Riek Machar and during the South Sudanese Civil War, once again joined on the side of Riek Machar's SPLA-IO
- SSDM – The South Sudan Democratic Movement was originally formed by George Athor and became an umbrella group for groups aligned against the Dinka-dominated government. The SSDM-Cobra faction was a Murle-led faction led by David Yau Yau which fought against the government during the war, except for a time when a semi-autonomous Murle-led state was granted called the Greater Pibor Administrative Area. The "Greater Pibor Forces" was formed in opposition to the deal with the government. Another faction was the Shilluk-led faction of SSDM called SSDM-Upper Nile faction led by John Uliny, which then formed its own militia called the "Agwelek forces" that fought the SPLA in the Greater Upper Nile region.
- (South Sudan) National Salvation Front
- South Sudan United Front

=== External powers ===
- (United Nations) UNMISS
- Uganda under President Yoweri Museveni sent troops to South Sudan on the side of the government and in 2014 helped retake all the cities captured by the rebels. As part of the Compromise Peace Agreement in 2015, Uganda agreed to withdraw its troops thus ending their intervention.

== See also ==
- Baratuku refugee settlement
- Central African Republic Civil War

== Bibliography ==
- International Institute for Strategic Studies (10 February 2015). "Chapter Seven: Middle East and North Africa". The Military Balance. 115 (1). Taylor & Francis: 303–362. doi:10.1080/04597222.2015.996362. ISSN 0459-7222.
- "Timeline of Recent Intra-Southern Conflict" (PDF). Geneva: Small Arms Survey. 27 June 2014. Archived from the original on 14 October 2014.
- Craze, Joshua; Tubiana, Jérôme; Gramizzi, Claudio (2016). "A State of Disunity: Conflict Dynamics in Unity State, South Sudan, 2013–15" (PDF). HSBA Working Paper (42). Geneva: Small Arms Survey. ISBN 978-2-940548-32-3. Archived from the original (PDF) on 17 June 2017.
- Martell, Peter (2019). First Raise a Flag: How South Sudan Won the Longest War but Lost the Peace. Oxford: Oxford University Press. ISBN 978-0-19-005270-6.
