= Kitgwang Declaration =

South Sudanese peace process

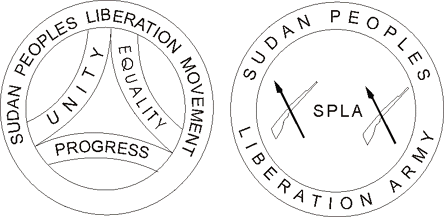
- Leaders: Simon Gatwech Dual; John Uliny; Thomas Mabor Dhol
- Dates active: 4 August 2021 – present
- Headquarters: Kitgwang, Magenis, South Sudan
- Active regions: South Sudan
- Ideology: Anti-government
- Wars: South Sudanese Civil War

The Kitgwang Declaration was a coup by South Sudanese rebel commander Simon Gatwech Dual on 4 August 2021, in which he replaced Vice President Riek Machar as leader of the Sudan People's Liberation Movement/Army in Opposition leading to a deadly conflict.

Since 2014, Gatwech has been the military chief of staff of the SPLM/A-IO and has grown hostile against Machar since the signing of the revitalized peace agreement in 2018.

== Background ==
Since Machar's return to Juba from exile to form a unity government with President Salva Kiir in February 2020, Dual begun speaking out against Machar for "compromising" key provisions of the revitalized peace agreement signed in 2018 such as the security arrangements in which rival forces of the opposition and the government were to be unified to form a professional national army.

In October 2020, Gatwech wrote to the IGAD, –the regional bloc which mediated the peace agreement that ended the war with Machar's appointment as vice president in February 2020– asking them to allow Machar to visit him to enable Machar to brief his forces about the implementation of the peace agreement.

The IGAD later issued a statement saying there were no restrictions in place against Machar and that he was free to visit anywhere of his choice. A few days later, Gatwech accused Machar of intentionally refusing to visit him and in June, an attempt to remove the opposition's military intelligence chief, Dhiling Keah Chuol, by Gatwech led to a rumored that Gatwech would be removed as chief of staff.

Days later, President Kiir appointed Gatwech as presidential envoy on peace after nomination by Machar. Machar's office later announced that Gatwech had been replaced as chief of staff of the opposition military deepening the disagreements within the group.

== The Declaration ==
On August 4, 2021, Gatwech issued a communiqué following a meeting of opposition commanders at Kitgwang in Magenis, a northern-most town bordering Sudan, declaring that Machar had been removed as the leader of the SPLM-IO and that he has assumed power as the new opposition leader.

Machar responded with another communiqué following a meeting of the SPLM-IO Political Bureau in Juba, the capital of South Sudan, and then accused unnamed "peace spoilers" of engineering the opposition split.

== Resulting fighting ==
On August 7, forces from the Tiger Battalion allied to Machar launched an attack on Gatwech's position in Magenis sparking fierce fighting that resulted in the killing of at least 28 soldiers from both sides. There were also unconfirmed reports of the killing of two senior SPLA-IO commanders allied to Machar.
