= Johnson Olony =

South Sudanese militia leader

- Born: South Sudan
- Military career
- Allegiance: South Sudan Democratic Movement
- Branch: South Sudanese military
- Rank: General
- Commands: Agwelek Forces
- Known for: Leadership in the Upper Nile region
- Conflicts: South Sudanese Civil War

Johnson Olony (Note: Alternatively spelled as John Uliny, Johnson Olonyi, and John Olony) is a South Sudanese militia leader. He is a member of the Shilluk ethnic group. He has at various points in time been allied with the South Sudan Democratic Movement, the Sudan People's Liberation Movement-in-Opposition and has led his own Agwelek Forces. He fought the South-Sudanese government in Upper Nile State between 2016 and 2018.

== Biography ==
Olony is from Upper Nile. He was the leader of a group of forces waiting for integration into the Sudan People's Liberation Army (SPLA). After a conflict emerged between his forces and the SPLA, he fled to South Kordofan in Sudan. There, he aligned himself with the South Sudan Democratic Movement (SSDM or SSDM/A) of George Athor.

In February 2012 –shortly after the death of Athor– he claimed the leadership of the South Sudan Democratic Movement. He subsequently entered into peace talks with the South Sudanese government. On 13 June 2013, he accepted the amnesty offered by the government of President Salva Kiir. He was formally inducted into the military and given the rank of major general. His forces, however, were not integrated into the army structure.

In February 2014, he took a shot to the neck after opposing forces aligned with Riek Machar entered the city of Malakal. In 2014 he joined the Sudan People's Liberation Movement-in-Opposition (SPLM-IO). In February 2015, his forces were reported by UNICEF to be forcibly enlisting child soldiers.

In April 2015, his deputy was shot and tensions between Olony's forces and the government's forces rose. The state government and governor left the city of Malakal which Olony's forces controlled. Olony did not report to government forces for weeks and did not attend meetings in Juba. On 15 May, Olony's forces declared they wished to run the affairs of Malakal independently, and announced the name of their group as Agwelek Forces. They stated they were willing to work together with other opposition forces such as the SPLM-IO. After September 2016 Yohanis Okiech split off from the Agwelek Forces, starting the Tiger Faction New Forces. They were ambushed by Olony's forces in January 2017 and Okiech was killed.

Olony's forces fought against government forces in Upper Nile state 2016–2018. In April 2017 Olony's forces lost control of Kodok which had been the headquarters of the SPLM-IO since 2014, the city of Pagak, became threatened and was lost in August 2017. In 2018 Machar proposed that Olony should be made governor of Upper Nile, this proposal was rejected by Mayardit. In 2021 he joined the Kitgwang Declaration of Simon Gatwech Dual against Machar. As of May 2023 Olony remained in Juba.
