= Intergovernmental Authority on Development =

Trade bloc in East Africa

Intergovernmental Authority on Development (IGAD) الهيئة الحكومية للتنمية Autorité intergouvernementale pour le développement
- Seal

- Member states Withdrawn Suspended Headquarters
- Headquarters: Djibouti City, Djibouti
- Official languages: English
- Membership: 7 member states: Djibouti; Ethiopia; Kenya; Somalia; Sudan; South Sudan (Note: Suspended membership.); Uganda; 21 partner states: Austria; Belgium; Canada; Chad; Denmark; Egypt; France; Germany; Greece; Ireland; Italy; Japan; Libya; Netherlands; Niger; Norway; Sweden; Tunisia; United Kingdom; United States; Yemen

Leaders
  - Chair: Ismail Omar Guelleh
  - Executive Secretary: Workneh Gebeyehu
- Establishment: January 1986 (as IGADD); 1996

Area
  - Total: 5,204,977 km^{2} (2,009,653 sq mi)
- GDP (PPP): 2026 estimate
  - Total: ▲$1.39 trillion (32nd)
  - Per capita: ▲$4,128 (165th)
- GDP (nominal): 2026 estimate
  - Total: ▲$411.82 billion (42nd)
  - Per capita: ▲$1,220 (174th)
- HDI (2023): ▲0.525 low (170th)
- Time zone: UTC+3 (East Africa Time)
- Website igad.int

The Intergovernmental Authority on Development (IGAD) is a trade bloc in Africa. It includes governments from the Horn of Africa, Nile Valley and the African Great Lakes. It is headquartered in Djibouti.

== Formation ==
The Intergovernmental Authority on Development was established in 1996. It succeeded the earlier Intergovernmental Authority on Drought and Development (IGADD), (Note: The first "D" in the abbreviation "IGADD" could mean "drought" or "disaster", while the second "D" meant "development".) a multinational body founded in 1986 by Djibouti, Ethiopia, Somalia, Sudan, Uganda and Kenya, with a focus on development and environmental control. IGADD's headquarters were later moved to Djibouti, following an agreement signed in January 1986 by the member states. Eritrea joined the organization in 1993, upon achieving independence.

In April 1995, the Assembly of Heads of State and Government met in Addis Ababa, where they agreed to strengthen cooperation through the organization. This was followed with the signing of a Letter of Instrument to Amend the IGADD Charter / Agreement on 21 March 1996. The Revitalised IGAD, a new organizational structure, was eventually launched on 25 November 1996 in Djibouti.

== Member states ==
=== Horn of Africa ===
- Djibouti (founding member, since 1986)
- Ethiopia (founding member, since 1986)
- Somalia (founding member, since 1986)

=== Nile Valley ===
- South Sudan (admitted 2011, suspended December 2021)
- Sudan (founding member since 1986, suspended participation in 2024, rejoined 2026)

=== African Great Lakes ===
- Kenya (founding member, since 1986)
- Uganda (founding member, since 1986)

=== Partner states ===
IGAD have partner states outside the Horn of Africa, Nile Valley and the African Great Lakes for participating at IGAD-RCP meetings on an ad hoc basis.

- Austria
- Belgium
- Canada
- Chad
- Denmark
- Egypt
- France
- Germany
- Greece
- Ireland
- Italy
- Japan
- Libya
- Netherlands
- Niger
- Norway
- Sweden
- Tunisia
- United Kingdom
- United States
- Yemen

=== Former members ===
- Eritrea (admitted 1993, withdrew 2007, attempted to rejoin in 2011, rejoined 2023, withdrew 2025)

== IGASOM/AMISOM ==
In September 2006, the AU Peace and Security Council approved an IGAD proposal to deploy an IGAD Peace Support Mission in Somalia (IGASOM).

On 21 February 2007, the United Nations Security Council approved Resolution 1744, which authorized the deployment of a new African Union Mission to Somalia (AMISOM) in place of IGASOM.

== Current situation ==
- IGAD is a principal supporter of the Federal Government of Somalia and backed it through the AMISOM and ATMIS initiatives.
- For its regionial strategy from 2021 to 2025 IGAD stated that their mission was to "promote regional cooperation and integration to add value to Member States efforts in achieving peace, security, and prosperity." And their aim was "transformation towards sustainable development, resilience and stability in the IGAD Region"
- As of early 2026, IGAD remains the primary regional body overseeing the Revitalized Agreement on the Resolution of the Conflict in the Republic of South Sudan (R-ARCSS), which was signed in September 2018 to end the civil war. On January 28 of 2026 IGAD Executive Secretary Workneh Gebeyehu Expressed concerns over 2026 Jonglei offensive.

== Structure ==
- The Assembly of Heads of State and Government is the supreme policy making organ of the Authority. It determines the objectives, guidelines and programs for IGAD and meets once a year. A Chairman is elected from among the member states in rotation.
- The Secretariat is headed by an Executive Secretary appointed by the Assembly of Heads of State and Government for a term of four years renewable once. The Secretariat assists member states in formulating regional projects in the priority areas, facilitates the coordination and harmonization of development policies, mobilizes resources to implement regional projects and programs approved by the council and reinforces national infrastructures necessary for implementing regional projects and policies. The current Executive Secretary is Workneh Gebeyehu of Ethiopia (since 29 November 2019).
- The Council of Ministers is composed of the Ministers of Foreign Affairs and one other Minister designated by each member state. The Council formulates policy, approves the work program and annual budget of the Secretariat during its biannual sessions.
- The Committee of Ambassadors comprises IGAD member states' Ambassadors or Plenipotentiaries accredited to the country of IGAD Headquarters. It convenes as often as the need arises to advise and guide the Executive Secretary.

Ambassador Mahboub Maalim handed over as Executive Secretary to Workneh Gebeyehu in late 2019. Maalim, a Kenyan nominee, had served from 2008 to 2019.

=== Executive Secretaries ===
No.	Name	Country	Took office	Left office
1	Mekonnen Kibret	Ethiopia	1986	1990
2	David Muduuli	Uganda	1991	1996
3	Tekeste Ghebray	Eritrea	1996	2000
4	Attalla Hamad Bashir	Sudan	2000	2008
5	Mahboub Maalim	Kenya	2008	2019
6	Workneh Gebeyehu	Ethiopia	2019	Incumbent

== Comparison with other regional trade blocs ==
African Economic Community
Pillar regional blocs (REC)	Area (km²)	Population	GDP (PPP) ($US)		Member states
Pillar regional blocs (REC)	Area (km²)	Population	(millions)	(per capita)	Member states
EAC	5,449,717	349,966,685	737,420	2,149	8
ECOWAS/CEDEAO	5,112,903	349,154,000	1,322,452	3,788	15
IGAD	5,233,604	294,197,387	225,049	1,197	7
AMU/UMA ^{4}	6,046,441	106,919,526	1,299,173	12,628	5
ECCAS/CEEAC	6,667,421	218,261,591	175,928	1,451	11
SADC	9,882,959	394,845,175	737,392	3,152	15
COMESA	12,873,957	406,102,471	735,599	1,811	20
CEN-SAD ^{4}	14,680,111				29
Total AEC	29,910,442	853,520,010	2,053,706	2,406	54
Other regional blocs	Area (km²)	Population	GDP (PPP) ($US)		Member states
Other regional blocs	Area (km²)	Population	(millions)	(per capita)	Member states
WAMZ ^{1}	1,602,991	264,456,910	1,551,516	5,867	6
SACU ^{1}	2,693,418	51,055,878	541,433	10,605	5
CEMAC ^{2}	3,020,142	34,970,529	85,136	2,435	6
UEMOA ^{1}	3,505,375	80,865,222	101,640	1,257	8
UMA ^{2} ^{4}	5,782,140	84,185,073	491,276	5,836	5
GAFTA ^{3} ^{4}	5,876,960	1,662,596	6,355	3,822	5
AES	2,780,159	71,374,000	179,347		3
During 2004. Sources: The World Factbook 2005, IMF WEO Database. Smallest value among the blocs compared. Largest value among the blocs compared.^{1}: Economic bloc inside a pillar REC.^{2}: Proposed for pillar REC, but objecting participation.^{3}: Non-African members of GAFTA are excluded from figures.^{4}: The area 446,550 km^{2} used for Morocco excludes all disputed territories, while 710,850 km^{2} would include the Moroccan-claimed and partially-controlled parts of Western Sahara (claimed as the Sahrawi Arab Democratic Republic by the Polisario Front). Morocco also claims Ceuta and Melilla, making up about 22.8 km^{2} (8.8 sq mi) more claimed territory.

== See also ==
- East African Community (EAC)
- Common Market for Eastern and Southern Africa (COMESA)
