= Wau Shilluk =

- Village
- Country: South Sudan
- State: Upper Nile
- County: Malakal County
- Established: July 9, 2011

Government
  - Type: Republic
  - President: Salva Kiir
- Elevation: 550 m (1,800 ft)

Population
  - Estimate: 50,000
- Time zone: UTC+3 (East Africa Time Zone)

Wau Shilluk is a village of 50,000 located in the Upper Nile state of South Sudan. Many who reside in Wau Shilluk are IDPs in need of refuge due to the recent civil war which has ravaged much of the land. Living conditions in the town are grim. Many of the residents live in small tents constructed from tarps. During the rainy season they live knee deep in water leading to contamination and recently a cholera outbreak. Along with the problems of flooding and poor housing, the populace also faces the threat of severe malnutrition. Farmers displaced by the civil war have been unable to plant crops leading to a food shortage in the country. Many of the people now rely on food distributed by UNICEF and the United Nations, however it does not seem to be enough and Shilukians explain they are unable to feed their entire family. Food imported by these groups is often looted by soldiers and rebels before it is able to make it to the civilians. It's estimated nearly 50,000 South Sudanese children will be lost this year unless food is properly distributed throughout the land. Many humanitarian groups are calling for more food and supplies in order to aid the situation. Unfortunately more aid will not be given until an official famine declaration is made. In 2015 several school children were kidnapped by forces loyal to Johnson Olony with the intention of their being forced to serve in the armed forces.

== History ==
South Sudan declared their independence from Sudan in 2011 with hopes of peace and independence. However, the past three years have been filled with internal fighting and increased poverty. Fighting has removed thousands of people from their homes. Many of these refugees are now residing in Wau Shilluk; which was not ready for the sudden influx. Due to inadequate sewage and drainage systems, the recent rainy season has flooded the fresh water reserves with waste; prompting a cholera outbreak. Cholera is an infection of the intestine which gives the afflicted diarrhea. If not treated, cholera can be fatal within hours. During July 2014 Medecins Sans Frontieres teams in Upper Nile state treated 904 patients for cholera. As of August 10, 2014 there were 894 cases reported with 17 deaths In Wau Shilluk South Sudan due to cholera, today the Mott is providing health care with support from IMA world health through the Rapid result fund.

== Culture ==
The Wau Shilluk inhabit Southern Sudan with a population of about 500,000, majority of them have converted over to Christianity, while little follow traditional religion, and even small numbers have converting to Islam.

The Shilluk language is uniformly spoken throughout all half million of these people. The country is broken up into north (Gar) and south (Iwak); within the north and south there are around 100 different ethnic clans or groups.

Agriculture is a way of life for these people where main crops consist of harvesting and consuming beans, simsim, maize, and sorghum. The Shilluk have thrived on fishing in the Nile River and surrounding tributaries fueling their diet of eating seafood.

Culture, morals are passed on orally from generation to generation, which is why the majority of traditions have been lost. One tradition not lost is marriage, which is the main goal in the lifetime of the Shilluk. It is an old fashion approach where word of mouth slowly reaches the ears of those dominant in the family. The finalization of the marriage entails a price of 10 cows or 30 sheep and goats to the family of the bride.
