= Pagak =

- town
- Location within South Sudan
- Coordinates: 8°29′N 34°01′E
- Country: South Sudan
- States of South Sudan: Upper Nile
- County: Maban County
- Time zone: UTC+2 (CAT)

Pagak is a town in South Sudan in Upper Nile state, a few kilometers from Jikawo across the Ethiopian border.

== History ==
Until 2017 Pagak served as headquarters for SPLA-IO rebels. On 6 August 2017 Pagak was captured by South Sudan government forces during the offensive. In late 2018, Pagak residents accused government troops of committing massive deforestation crimes. The residents alleged that government soldiers cut down trees and sell them to Ethiopian traders in the form of charcoal.
