= Sudan People's Liberation Movement-in-Opposition =

Political party in South Sudan

- Abbreviation: SPLM-IO
- Leader: Riek Machar
- Chief of General Staffs: Simon Gatwech Dual
- Secretary-general: Tingo Peter Regbigo
- Founded: 15 December 2013
- Split from: Sudan People's Liberation Movement
- Headquarters: Pagak (until 2017); Juba (2019–present)
- Ideology: Social democracy; Nuer interests
- Political position: Centre-left
- Colours: Green
- National Legislative Assembly: 128 / 550 (23%)
- Council of States: 27 / 100 (27%)

The Sudan People's Liberation Movement-in-Opposition (abbreviated SPLM-IO), also known as the anti-governmental forces (AGF), is the main South Sudanese opposition political party and rebel group that split from the Sudan People's Liberation Movement in 2013, due to political tensions between President Salva Kiir and Vice President Riek Machar over leadership of the SPLM. Tensions grew between forces loyal to Kiir and Machar and South Sudan plunged into the South Sudanese Civil War.

The party and militia are led by Riek Machar. Machar appointed General Simon Gatwech Dual as Army Chief of General Staff, deputized by the Deputy Chief of General Staffs for operations, training, political and moral orientation, logistics, administration and finance. In June 2021, Machar removed General Gatwech Dual from the position and appointed him into the Presidency as an adviser. Gatwech however, rejected the new role, rejected Machar's leadership of the SPLM/A-IO, and declared himself interim leader, which led to fighting between Machar allies and those loyal to Gen. Gatwech formerly known as the Kit-Gwang faction throughout 2021.

== Etymology ==
During the Nasir convention in April 2014, the rebels in the South Sudanese Civil War were split on whether to maintain an affiliation with the ruling SPLM party. While Maj. Gen. Garouth Gatkuoth and many generals spoke against a SPLM affiliation, Angelina Teny and much of the leadership were in favor, leading Riek Machar to defer a final decision. The group decided on the provisional name SPLM-SPLA. Shortly after the meeting, however, the media began to call the group the SPLM-in-Opposition, due to its opposition to the governing SPLM party.

== History ==
The SPLM-IO was established in December 2013, following tensions within the ruling SPLM that escalated into a full-scale conflict. After President Salva Kiir dismissed Riek Machar as vice president, violence broke out in Juba, leading to a split in the SPLM. Machar and his supporters fled the capital and declared their opposition to Kiir’s government, leading to the creation of the SPLM-IO as an armed rebel movement.

During the South Sudanese Civil War, the SPLM-IO engaged in intense fighting with government forces, controlling large territories in parts of Upper Nile, Jonglei, and Unity states. The conflict was marked by allegations of war crimes, ethnic violence, and humanitarian crises.

A series of peace negotiations were held between the SPLM-IO and the government, mediated by the Intergovernmental Authority on Development (IGAD) and international partners. This culminated in the Revitalized Agreement on the Resolution of the Conflict in South Sudan (R-ARCSS), signed in September 2018, which called for a unity government.

In February 2020, Riek Machar was reinstated as First Vice President under a power-sharing agreement. However, tensions and sporadic clashes have continued between the SPLM-IO and government forces.

According to the SPLM-IO, Machar was put under house arrest on 26 March 2025, along with his wife, interior minister Angelina Teny, after an armed convoy led by top government officials entered his residence in Juba. Their guards were disarmed and taken to an unknown location. The party stated that the 2018 peace agreement with the government was effectively void as a result. On 28 March, the South Sudanese government announced that Machar was under house arrest.

== Politics ==
By May 2018, the SPLM/A-IO had set up a "parallel bush government" in Upper Nile, rivaling the government in Juba. People in rebel-held areas no longer accepted South Sudanese currency which had lost its worth due to hyperinflation, and instead used United States dollars and Ethiopian birr.

=== Ideology ===
The SPLM-IO initially positioned itself as a reformist faction within the broader SPLM movement, advocating for:

- Federalism in South Sudan to address ethnic and regional grievances.
- Democratic governance and transparency in government institutions.
- Accountability for human rights violations committed during the civil war.
- Greater autonomy for states and local communities.

Over time, the SPLM-IO’s ideological stance has been shaped by shifting alliances and political realities. While it still calls for democratic reforms, critics argue that its leadership has been driven more by power struggles than consistent policy goals.

In 2018, a South Sudanese critical writer and analyst Duop Chak Wuol questioned SPLM-IO's overall strategy, arguing that the movement's leadership pursued a political solution as part of its efforts to end the civil war without a good plan for its military wing.

=== Governance ===
Following the 2020 power-sharing agreement, the SPLM-IO has played a role in South Sudan’s transitional government, holding key ministerial positions. However, tensions remain over the distribution of power, security arrangements, and electoral preparations. The SPLM-IO has often accused Kiir’s government of obstructing agreed-upon reforms, further straining the fragile peace process. Despite being part of the unity government, the SPLM-IO continues to operate semi-independently, balancing its governance role with maintaining its political and military influence.

== Armed wing ==
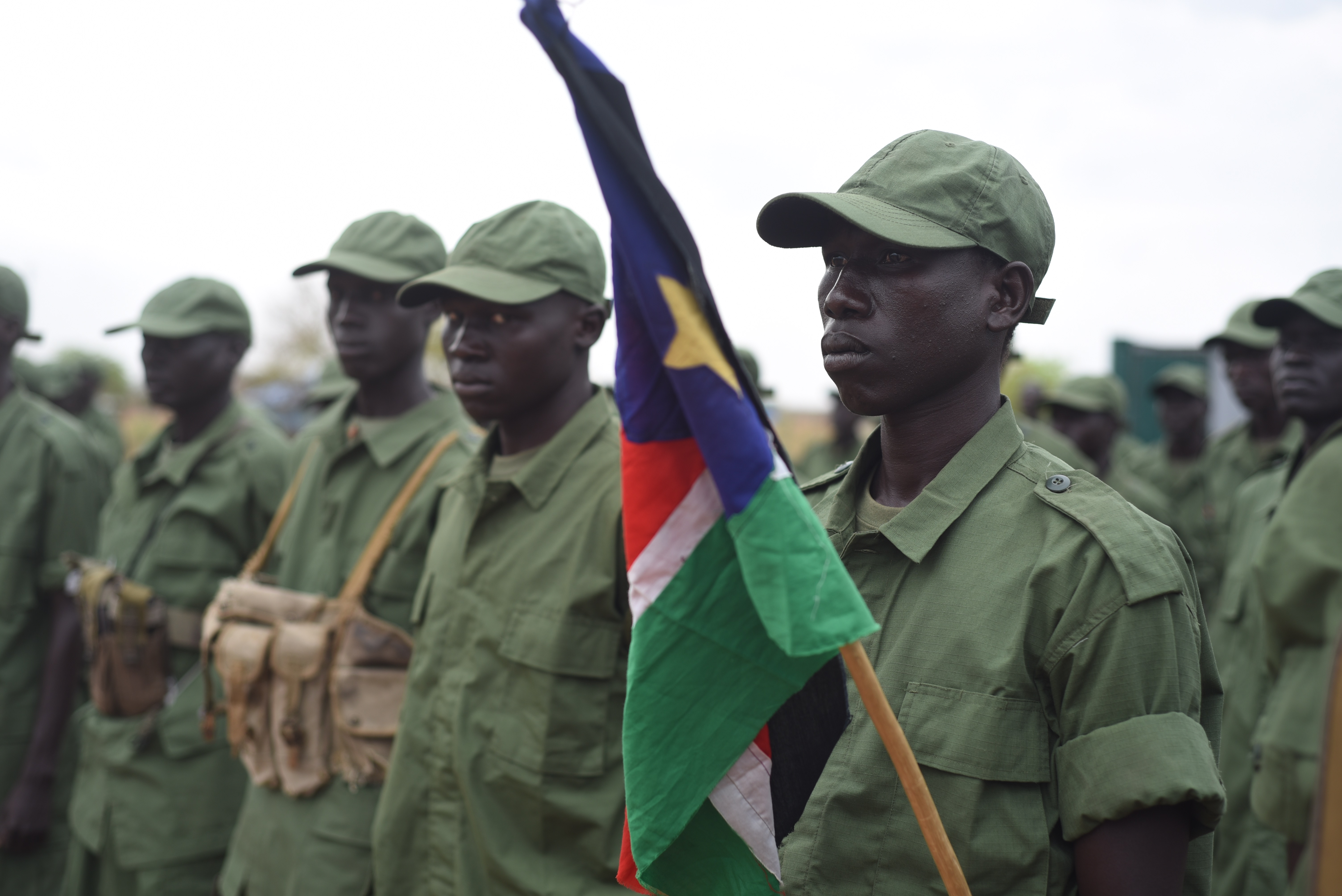
SPLA-IO soldiers in April 2016.

The military forces of the SPLM-IO are known as "Sudan People's Liberation Army-in-Opposition" (abbreviated "SPLA-IO") and consist of deserters from the Sudan People's Liberation Army (SPLA), alongside the private armies of rebel warlords and tribal militias. Those elements of the South Sudanese military that joined the SPLA-IO have done so to protect tribal interests or felt marginalized by the government due to their previous membership in the SSDF. Despite attempts by Machar to attract other ethnic groups to his cause, the SPLA-IO is dominated by Nuer people. Parts of the SPLA-IO are known to recruit child soldiers.

For weapons to fight the South Sudanese civil war, the SPLA-IO used a "shadowy" network of arms dealers, of which little is known other than that most of the gunrunners appeared to be European. A rare exception was the Franco-Polish arms dealer Pierre Dadak who was arrested on 14 July 2016 at his villa in Ibiza. At his villa, the Spanish National Police Corps allege that they found documents showing he was negotiating to sell the SPLA-IO 40,000 AK-47 assault rifles, 30,000 PKM machine guns and 200,000 boxes of ammunition.

In 2017 SPLA-IO lost the town of Pagak on the Ethiopian border during a government offensive.

=== Organization ===
The SPLA-IO did not have a formal military structure until the Pagak I conference in December 2014, after a year of war. Riek Machar created the following structure:

Simon Gatwich as chief of general staff with the following deputies:

- Maj. Gen. Peter Gadet Yak, operations
- Maj. Gen. Garouth Gatkouth, logistics
- Maj. Gen. Dau Atujong, training
- Maj. Gen. Martin Kenyi, moral orientation
- Maj. Gen. Elias Juda Kulang, administration
- Maj. Gen. Moses Chot Riek, military production
- Maj. Gen. John Both Teny, general headquarters command
- Maj. Gen. Gabriel Tang Gatwich Chan, inspector general.

Along with the following commands:

- Maj. Gen. James Khor Chuol, Latjor Division 5
- Maj. Gen. Thomas Mabor Dhuo, Phou Division 7
- Maj. Gen. Peter Dor Manjur, Bieh Division 8
- Maj. Gen. Maguek Gai Majak, Lich Division 4
- Maj. Gen. James Koang Chuol, 1st Special Division
- Maj. Gen. Martin Terento Kenyi, Eastern Equatoria
- Maj. Gen. Salem El Haj, Central Equatoria
- Col. Wesley Welba, Mid-Western Equatoria
- Maj. Gen. Dau Aturjong, Northern Bahr el Ghazal
- Maj. Gen. Thomas Basilo Tindo, Western Bahr el Ghazal

== International Relations ==
The SPLM-IO has engaged with international actors, including:

- IGAD and the African Union (AU): Mediating peace talks and monitoring the ceasefire.
- United Nations (UN): The UN has called for the full implementation of the peace agreement and an end to human rights abuses by all parties.
- Western governments (USA, UK, EU): These countries have supported peace efforts through diplomatic pressure and humanitarian aid.
- Sudan and Ethiopia: Neighboring countries have played roles in both supporting and pressuring SPLM-IO, given their own strategic interests in South Sudan.

== Criticism & Controversy ==
The SPLM-IO has been accused of committing human rights violations, including:

- Ethnic killings and recruitment of child soldiers.
- Attacks on civilians during the war.
- Internal suppression of dissent within the movement.

Some critics argue that Machar and other SPLM-IO leaders have prioritized personal political ambitions over genuine democratic reforms. The SPLM-IO's reliance on ethnic-based mobilization has also contributed to inter-communal violence, complicating South Sudan’s path to stability.

== See also ==
- Nuer White Army
- Sudan People's Liberation Army
