= Simon Gatwech Dual =

Sudanese rebel

Simon Gatwech Dual (also spelled Simon Gatwitch) is a Sudanese rebel Major General who was born in around the late 1930s in what is today Uror County, Jonglei state, South Sudan.

== Politics ==
He joined the Sudan People's Liberation Movement (SPLM) under John Garang during the struggle against the Sudanese government, and broke away in 1991 when Riek Machar, Gordon Koang and Lam Akol formed the SPLA-Nasir faction. Gatwech led the Bor massacre in November 1991 which included many White Army fighters. He joined the Sudan People's Liberation Movement-in-Opposition (SPLM-IO) in 2013 when war broke out in Juba between forces loyal to the president Salva Kiir and those loyal to the opposition led by Machar.

Gatwech was appointed as chief of general staff of the SPLA-IO on 21 December 2014 and remains in that position until he attempted to overthrow Machar on 4 August 2021 and returned to Juba following the August 2015 peace agreement between Kiir and Machar.

On 4 August 2021, Gatwech made a declaration, the Kitgwang Declaration, to announce the removal of Machar as the leader of the SPLM-IO and that he has assumed power as the new leader.

On 3 February 2025, Gatwech signed a peace agreement with president Kiir in a ceremony in Sudan in which Gatwech's group would be integrated into the South Sudan People's Defence Forces.
