= Deaths in February 1998 =

The following is a list of notable deaths in February 1998.

Entries for each day are listed alphabetically by surname. A typical entry lists information in the following sequence:

- Name, age, country of citizenship at birth, subsequent country of citizenship (if applicable), reason for notability, cause of death (if known), and reference.

== February 1998 ==
=== 1 ===
- Robert Creighton Buck, 77, American mathematician.
- Jack T. Collis, 75, American art director.
- Marga Faulstich, 82, German glass chemist.
- Edvard Hočevar, 71, Yugoslavian footballer.
- Gérard Séty, 75, French actor.
- Sheila Watson, 88, Canadian novelist and literary critic.

=== 2 ===
- Raymond Cattell, 92, British and American psychologist.
- Duilio Del Prete, 59, Italian actor, dubber and singer-songwriter, cancer.
- Gertrude Scharff Goldhaber, 86, German-American nuclear physicist.
- Ferdinand A. Hermens, 91, German-American political scientist and economist.
- Viljo Kajava, 88, Finnish poet and writer.
- Pietro Masala, 53, Italian-born German Olympic weightlifter (1972).
- Robert McIntyre, 84, Scottish politician.
- Baldev Singh, 93, Indian neurologist.
- Roger L. Stevens, 87, American theatrical producer, arts administrator, and real estate executive.
- Haroun Tazieff, 83, French volcanologist and geologist.
- Manuel Delgado Villegas, 55, Spanish serial killer, chronic obstructive pulmonary disease.
- Zahari Zhandov, 86, Bulgarian film director, script writer and cinematographer.

=== 3 ===
- Joey Archibald, 83, American boxer.
- Wally Clune, 67, Canadian ice hockey player (Montreal Canadiens).
- Elt Drenth, 48, Dutch Olympic swimmer (1968).
- Clark Goff, 80, American gridiron football player (Pittsburgh Pirates).
- Bertram Heyn, 85, Sri Lankan general and cricketer.
- Davy Kaye, 81, British actor and entertainer.
- Gabriel Laub, 69, Czechoslovak journalist and writer.
- Fat Pat, 27, American rapper, shot.
- Karla Faye Tucker, 38, American convicted murderer, executed by lethal injection.
- Roy Welmaker, 84, American baseball player.

=== 4 ===
- Eranuhi Aslamazyan, 88, Armenian and Soviet graphic artist.
- Lulof Heetjans, 81, Dutch footballer.
- Jean Blackwell Hutson, 83, African-American librarian, writer and curator.
- Zoran Kosanović, 42, Serbian Canadian table tennis player, heart attack.
- Aruna Lama, 52, Nepali singer.
- Menachem Shmuel David Raichik, 79, American Orthodox rabbi.
- Michel Roux, 73, French baritone.
- Rees Stephens, 75, Welsh rugby player.
- Cristóbal Martínez-Bordiú, 10th Marquis of Villaverde, 75, Spanish aristocrat and son in law of dictator Francisco Franco.

=== 5 ===
- Wilbur Coen, 86, American tennis player.
- Douglas Gamley, 73, Australian composer.
- Margaret Hillis, 76, American conductor.
- Tim Kelly, 35, American guitarist of the band Slaughter, traffic collision.
- Kim Ki-young, 78, South Korean film director, injuries from a fire.
- Marv Olson, 90, American baseball player (Boston Red Sox).
- Eduardo Francisco Pironio, 77, Argentine Roman Catholic cardinal, bone cancer.
- Argemiro Roque, 74, Brazilian Olympic sprinter (1952).
- Joe Stubbs, American R&B/Soul singer, heart failure.
- Chikuzan Takahashi, 87, Japanese Tsugaru-jamisen performer and composer.
- Hans Wallach, 93, German-American experimental psychologist.
- Nick Webb, 43, English acoustic guitarist and composer, pancreatic cancer.

=== 6 ===
- Nazim al-Kudsi, 91, president and prime minister of Syria.
- Falco, 40, Austrian singer and songwriter ("Rock Me Amadeus"), traffic collision.
- Adolphus Grimes, 84, American baseball player.
- Tony LeVier, 84, American air racer and test pilot, cancer.
- Ferenc Sidó, 74, Czechoslovak table tennis player.
- Toshiaki Tanaka, 62, Japanese table tennis player.
- Carl Wilson, 51, American musician, singer, and songwriter (The Beach Boys), lung cancer.
- Claude Érignac, 60, French prefect of Corsica, shot.

=== 7 ===
- Gunther Baumann, 77, German football player and manager.
- Ascanio Cortés, 83, Chilean football player.
- Bobby Kemp, 38, American football player (Cincinnati Bengals, Tampa Bay Buccaneers), suicide.
- Norman J. Levy, 67, American lawyer and politician.
- Hugo Lundkvist, 84, Swedish Olympic sports shooter (1952).
- Everardo Múzquiz, 86, Mexican Olympic sprinter (1932).
- Lawrence Sanders, 77, American novelist and short story writer.

=== 8 ===
- Elizabeth Bauer Mock, 86–87, American professor, curator, author and journalist.
- Betty Foss, 68, American baseball player.
- Tulsiram Sharma Kashyap, 58, Indian writer and politician.
- Halldór Laxness, 95, Icelandic writer and Nobel Prize laureate, Alzheimer's disease.
- Bob Naber, 68, American basketball player (Indianapolis Olympians).
- Enoch Powell, 85, British politician, classical scholar, author and philologist, Parkinson's disease.
- Rocke Robertson, 85, American physician.
- J. B. Salsberg, 95, Canadian politician.
- Julian Simon, 65, American economist and author, heart attack.
- Joseph Van Beeck, 86, Belgian footballer.

=== 9 ===
- George Cafego, 82, American football player (Brooklyn Dodgers, Washington Redskins, Boston Yanks), and coach.
- Gene Collins, 73, American baseball player.
- Cyrille Delannoit, 71, Belgian middleweight boxing champion.
- Elbert Eatmon, 83, American baseball player.
- Bill Froats, 67, American baseball player (Detroit Tigers).
- Gabriel Gobin, 94, Belgian film actor.
- Dean Griffing, 82, American gridiron football player, coach and executive.
- Alf Jefferies, 76, English footballer.
- Panagiotis Katsouris, 21, Greek footballer, traffic collision.
- Nick Leluk, 62, Canadian politician.
- William Ronald, 71, Canadian painter.
- Bennie Schall, 80, American basketball player.
- Maurice Schumann, 86, French politician, journalist and writer.

=== 10 ===
- Geoffrey Adams, 88, English cricketer.
- Ramchandran Jaikumar, 53, Indian-American scientist, heart attack.
- Richard Kotuk, 54, American journalist, producer and filmmaker, heart attack.
- Alex Kramer, 94, Canadian songwriter.
- Peter Longbottom, 38, British cyclist and Olympian (1992), traffic collision.
- Paul MacKendrick, 83, American classicist, author, and teacher.
- Erich Mückenberger, 87, German socialist politician.
- Félix Reina, 76, Cuban violinist, arranger and composer, stroke.

=== 11 ===
- Tore Børrehaug, 53, Norwegian footballer.
- Joy Buba, 93, American sculptor and illustrator.
- Patrick Clark, 42, American chef, amyloidosis.
- Tanvir Dar, 50, Pakistani field hockey player and Olympian (1968).
- Thomas Gerard Dunn, 76, American politician.
- Mike Fornieles, 66, Cuban-American baseball player.
- Lily Harmon, American visual artist.
- Jonathan Hole, 93, American actor.
- Josef Issels, 90, German physician, pneumonia.
- Radhanath Rath, 101, Indian journalist, activist and politician.

=== 12 ===
- Gardner Ackley, 82, American economist and diplomat.
- Lionel Aldridge, 56, American gridiron football player (Green Bay Packers, San Diego Chargers).
- Lauri Kivekäs, 94, Finnish businessman and politician.
- George Humphrey Middleton, 88, British diplomat.
- Ralf Reichenbach, 47, German shot putter and Olympian (1972, 1976).
- Notable victims of the 1998 Sudanese Air Force Antonov An-32 crash:
  - Zubair Mohamed Salih, 53-54. Sudanese military officer and politician, vice president (since 1993)
  - Arok Thon Arok, South Sudanese rebel leader

=== 13 ===
- José Barraquer, 82, Spanish ophthalmologist.
- Michael Budrock, 68, American Olympic canoeist (1952).
- Thomas Chapin, 40, American composer and musician, leukemia.
- Jo Clayton, 58, American fantasy and science fiction author, multiple myeloma.
- John Cowley, 74, Irish actor.
- Hans Diergaardt, 70, Namibian politician.
- Wayne Gift, 82, American football player (Cleveland Rams).
- Bryan MacMahon, 88, Irish writer.
- Michael Palmer, 62, British middle-distance runner and Olympian (1960).
- Alfred Struwe, 70, German actor, pneumonia.
- Ladislav Štípek, 73, Czechoslovak table tennis player.

=== 14 ===
- Badrul Haider Chowdhury, 73, Chief Justice of Bangladesh.
- Edgar Granville, Baron Granville of Eye, 100, British politician.
- Christopher Grose-Hodge, 73, British Olympic fencer (1952).
- Gien de Kock, 89, Dutch athlete and Olympian (!936).
- Thomas McKimson, 90, American animator.
- Hansel Mieth, 88, German-American photojournalist.
- Denise Paulme, 88, French Africanist and anthropologist.
- Manuel Pérez, 54, Colombian guerrilla leader, hepatitis.

=== 15 ===
- Norman Casmir, 67, German Olympic fencer (1952).
- Sir Samuel Curran, 85, British physicist and university administrator.
- Martha Gellhorn, 89, American novelist, travel writer, and journalist, suicide by cyanide poisoning.
- B. Calvin Jones, 59, American archaeologist.
- Louie Spicolli, 27, American professional wrestler, overdose.
- George White, 86, American film editor.

=== 16 ===
- Mary Amdur, 76, American toxicologist, heart attack.
- Boris Blumin, 90, Canadian-American chess master.
- Denis Hegarty, 85, South African Olympic sailor (1956).
- Harry Hinsley, 79, British historian and cryptanalyst.
- Fernando Abril Martorell, 61, former Spanish Deputy Prime Minister, lung cancer.
- Matti Tammelin, 71, Finnish Olympic boxer (1948).
- Sheu Yuan-dong, 70, Taiwanese politician and governor of the Central Bank, plane crash.

=== 17 ===
- Arnold Aronson, 86, American civil rights leader.
- Nicolas Bouvier, 68, Swiss writer, artist, and photographer.
- Maurice Bucaille, 77, French physician and author.
- Giorgio Cattaneo, 74, Italian Olympic speed skater (1948).
- Bimal Chandra, 70, Indian swimmer and Olympian (1948).
- Hilaire Couvreur, 73, Belgian cyclist.
- Anibál Filiberti, 83, Argentine Olympic water polo player (1948).
- Oscar Hanson, 87, Canadian-born American ice hockey player (Chicago Black Hawks).
- Ernst Jünger, 102, German World War I hero, author and entomologist.
- Ernst Käsemann, 91, German Lutheran theologian, murdered around 24 May 1977.
- Bob Merrill, 76, American songwriter, theatrical composer and screenwriter, suicide.
- Sheila Raynor, 91, British actress.
- Ruth Robertson, 92, American photojournalist.
- Marie-Louise von Franz, 83, Swiss Jungian psychologist and scholar.
- Albert Wass, 90, Hungarian nobleman, novelist and poet, suicide.

=== 18 ===
- Lidia Bongiovanni, 83, Italian versatile athlete and Olympian (1936).
- James E. Boyd, 91, American physicist and mathematician.
- Harry Caray, 83, American television and radio broadcaster, heart attack.
- David Crouch, 78, British politician.
- Antonio Escuriet, 88, Spanish road cyclist.
- Robbie James, 40, Welsh footballer, heart attack.
- Bob Lytle, 81, American basketball player.
- Jack McCarthy, 80, Australian cricketer.
- Scott O'Hara, 36, American pornographic performer, author, poet and publisher, AIDS.
- Messias Timula, 49, Portuguese footballer.
- Mya Than Tint, 68, Myanmar writer, brain hemorrhage.
- Richard Crawford White, 74, American politician, member of the United States House of Representatives (1965-1983) heart attack.

=== 19 ===
- Frankie Genovese, 82, Canadian Olympic boxer (1932).
- Wolfgang Händler, 77, German mathematician and pioneering computer scientist.
- Fernando Jardón, 81, Spanish Olympic field hockey player (1948).
- Grandpa Jones, 84, American "old time" country and gospel music singer, stroke.
- Horatio Lamar, 86, American baseball player.
- George Male, 87, English footballer.
- Charlie Martin, 84, Welsh racing driver.
- Mancur Olson, 66, American economist and social scientist.
- Leo Righetti, 72, American baseball player.
- Thomas F. Riley, 85, United States Marine Corps brigadier general, cardiac arrest.
- Talish, Pakistani actor.

=== 20 ===
- Francis Coulson, 78, British chef and hotelier.
- John Fulton, 65, American bullfighter, heart attack.
- Henry Livings, 68, English playwright and screenwriter.
- David McClure, 72, Scottish artist and lecturer.
- Ivor Mairants, 90, Polish jazz and classical guitarist, teacher and composer.
- Bob McBride, 51, Canadian rock singer-songwriter, heart failure.
- Virgilio Tommasi, 92, Italian long jumper and Olympian (1924, 1928).

=== 21 ===
- Archie Aikman, 72, Scottish football player.
- Ramón Bravo, 72, Mexican diver, photographer and underwater filmmaker, heart attack.
- Santos Colon, 75, Puerto Rican bolero and mambo singer.
- Ellis Credle, 95, American children's author and illustrator.
- James M. Edie, 70, American philosopher, cancer.
- George Fant, 81, Swedish actor, director and theater manager, pneumonia.
- Karl Geyer, 98, Austrian football player and coach.
- Yoshio Miyajima, 89, Japanese cinematographer.
- John Nicolella, 52, American film, television director and producer.
- Baboo Nimal, 89, Indian Olympic field hockey player (1936).
- Om Prakash, 78, Indian actor.
- William Wheeler, 87, English Roman Catholic prelate and bishop.

=== 22 ===
- Carlo Dionisotti, 89, Italian literary critic, philologist and essayist.
- Alfred Hales, 88, Canadian businessman and politician, member of the House of Commons of Canada (1957-1974).
- Sandy Hume, 28, American journalist, suicide by gunshot.
- José María de Areilza, Count of Motrico, 88, former Spanish Minister of Foreign Affairs.
- Jovan Kratohvil, 73, Yugoslavian Olympic sports shooter (1952).
- Emmy Lou Packard, 83, American artist.
- Russell Reeder, 95, United States Army officer and author.
- Abraham A. Ribicoff, 87, American Democratic Party Party politician.
- Athol Rowan, 77, South African international cricket player.
- Donald S. Russell, 92, American judge and politician.
- Warren B. Woodson, 94, American football, basketball, and baseball coach, colon cancer.
- Han Youwen, 85, Chinese general in the National Revolutionary Army.

=== 23 ===
- Philip Abbott, 73, American actor, cancer.
- Marie Adams, 72, American gospel and R&B singer.
- Augusta Braxton Baker, 86, African-American librarian and storyteller.
- Keith Christopher, 40, American actor, singer/songwriter and AIDS activist, AIDS.
- Chuck Hayward, 78, American motion picture stuntman and actor, Hodgkin's Disease.
- Raman Lamba, 38, Indian cricketer, cricket accident.
- Sean A. Moore, 33, American fantasy and science fiction writer, traffic collision.
- Potti Prasad, 69, Indian actor.
- Ray Stoviak, 82, American baseball player (Philadelphia Phillies).
- Billy Sullivan, 82, American businessman, prostate cancer.

=== 24 ===
- Geoffrey Bush, 77, British composer and music scholar, prostate cancer.
- Daniel J. Crowley, 76, American art historian and cultural anthropologist, congestive heart failure.
- Leonard Daniels, 88, British artist and teacher.
- Elinor Field, 96, American film actress.
- John Forman, 72, American Olympic sports shooter (1956).
- Clara Fraser, 74, American marxist, feminist and activist, emphysema.
- Ernst Gutstein, 73, Austrian operatic baritone.
- Harold Keith, 95, American author.
- Terry Langford, 31, American convicted murderer, execution by lethal injection.
- Milicent Patrick, 82, American actress, makeup artist and animator.
- Lalita Pawar, 81, Indian actress.
- Antonio Prohías, 77, Cuban cartoonist (Spy vs. Spy), lung cancer.
- Abraham Shneior, 69, Israeli basketball player and Olympian (1952).
- Henny Youngman, 91, English-American comedian.

=== 25 ===
- Frans Bonduel, 90, Belgian road bicycle racer.
- Francesca Braggiotti, 95, Italian dancer and actress.
- Joe Gallagher, 83, American baseball player (New York Yankees, St. Louis Browns, Brooklyn Dodgers).
- Harlan Hatcher, 99, American novelist and university president.
- Wanda Jakubowska, 90, Polish film director.
- Umberto Mastroianni, 87, Italian abstract sculptor.
- W. O. Mitchell, 83, Canadian writer and broadcaster, prostate cancer.
- Pruden, 81, Spanish football player.
- B. A. Santamaria, 82, Australian anti-communist political activist and journalist, brain cancer.
- Rockin' Sidney, 59, American R&B, zydeco and soul musician, throat cancer.
- Vico Torriani, 77, Swiss actor and Schlager singer, cancer.
- Luigi Veronesi, 89, Italian photographer, painter, and film director.

=== 26 ===
- James Algar, 85, American film director, screenwriter and producer.
- Roland Caranci, 76, American football player (New York Giants).
- Jaap ter Haar, 75, Dutch children's author.
- Jimmy Hagan, 80, English football player and manager.
- Otto Haxel, 88, German nuclear physicist.
- Robert Jones, 67, American lawyer, politician and civil rights litigator.
- Josef Knottenbelt, 87, Dutch tennis player.
- Shirley Ardell Mason, 75, American psychiatric patient and art teacher, breast cancer.
- Stepan Neustroev, 75, Soviet officer and World War II hero.
- Theodore Schultz, 95, American economist, Nobel Prize laureate.

=== 27 ===
- Carlos Ascanio, 79, Venezuelan baseball player.
- Larry Friend, 62, American basketball player (New York Knicks), prostate cancer.
- John Harman, 65, Australian politician.
- George H. Hitchings, 92, American scientist and Nobel Prize laureate.
- Martin Hollis, 59, British philosopher.
- Elsy Jacobs, 64, Luxembourgish road bicycle racer.
- Gerald David Lascelles, 73, British nobleman.
- Jack Micheline, 68, American painter and poet.
- Henry Munyaradzi, 66/67, Zimbabwean sculptor.
- Alice Rivaz, 96, Swiss author and feminist.
- J. T. Walsh, 54, American actor (A Few Good Men, Sling Blade, Backdraft), heart attack.

=== 28 ===
- Ivan Arkhipov, 90, Soviet and Russian statesman.
- Todd Duncan, 95, American opera singer and actor, heart ailment.
- Hildegarde Howard, 96, American paleontologist.
- Daniel Katz, 94, American psychologist.
- Marie Kettnerová, 86, Czech table tennis player.
- Dermot Morgan, 45, Irish comedian and actor (Father Ted), heart attack.
- Antonio Quarracino, 74, Argentine Roman Catholic cardinal and archbishop, heart attack.
- Arkady Shevchenko, 67, Russian/Soviet diplomat and defector, liver cirrhosis.
- Injac Zamputi, 88, Albanian scholar, writer, and historian.
