= List of wars involving South Sudan =

This is a list of wars involving the Republic of South Sudan.

Conflict	Combatant 1	Combatant 2	Results	President of South Sudan
First Sudanese Civil War (1955–1972)	SDF mutineers, bandits, and unaffiliated separatist militias ALF (1965–1970); Anyanya (from 1963); Israel (from 1969); Supported by: Ethiopia; Uganda (from about 1970) (Democratic Republic of the Congo) Congo-Léopoldville; Kenya; France	(Egypt) Anglo-Egyptian Sudan (1955–1956); Republic of the Sudan (1956–1969); Democratic Republic of the Sudan (1969–1972); Combat support: Uganda (Joint operations on Ugandan territory, 1965–1969); Libyan Arab Republic (From 1969 and combat involvement at least in 1970); Non-combat support: United Arab Republic; Soviet Union; United Kingdom; China; Yugoslavia; East Germany; Czechoslovakia; Saudi Arabia; Kingdom of Libya (until 1969); Algeria; United States; West Germany	Stalemate: Addis Ababa Agreement; Establishment of the Southern Sudan Autonomous Region with various defined powers	None
Second Sudanese Civil War (1983–2005)	SPLA: SPLA-Mainstream; SPLA-Agar; SPDF; ALF; Titweng; SSLM; NDA; Sudanese Alliance Forces; Anyanya II; Eastern Coalition; Derg (until 1987); PDR Ethiopia (1987–1991); FDR Ethiopia (1995–1998); Eritrea (1996–1998, 2002–2005); Uganda (from 1993); Non-combat aid: Libya (1983–1985); Israel; Cuba (until 1991)	Sudan: Armed Forces; PDF; Army of Peace; Muraheleen; (Rwanda) Ex-FAR and Interahamwe; SSDF; SPLA dissidents: SPLA-Nasir; SPLA-United; SSIM/A; Nuer White Army (Uganda) Ugandan insurgents: LRA; WNBF; UNRF (II); Zaire (1994–1997) al-Qaeda (1991–1996); Iraq (Note: Iraqi support for Sudan during the war mostly consisted of weapons shipments; according to the South Sudanese, however, at least one unit of Iraqi paratroopers fought alongside the SAF near Juba. About 200 Iraqi soldiers were allegedly killed, and the site of their remains became known as "Jebel Iraqi". The International Institute for Strategic Studies also stated that Iraqi forces fought alongside Sudanese government troops.); China (Note: Although China was not officially involved in the war, it sent troops to the country in order to protect oil fields and thereby aid the Sudanese military. China also provided Sudan with weaponry.) Combat aid: Libya (1986–1991); DR Congo (1998–2003) Non-combat aid: Iran; Belarus (from 1996)	Stalemate: Comprehensive Peace Agreement; Eastern Sudan Peace Agreement; Independence of the Republic of South Sudan following a 2011 referendum; Unresolved issues result in the Sudan–SPLM-N conflict, and the South Sudanese Civil War	None
Disarmament of the Lou Nuer (2005–2006)	(South Sudan) Southern Sudan: (South Sudan) SPLA	Lou Nuer White Army; SSDF forces of Thomas Maboir; SSDF forces of Simon Gatwitch; Supported by: Sudan	SPLA victory: Nuer White Army disarmed	Salva Kiir
George Athor's rebellion (2010–2011)	South Sudan (Southern Sudan Autonomous Region until July 2011)	South Sudan Democratic Movement (SSDM); Gabriel Tanginye's militia Supported by: Sudan; Eritrea (alleged); EUPF (alleged)	South Sudanese government victory: Death of George Athor; Many rebel areas retaken by government forces; Athor's forces largely surrender in February 2012	Salva Kiir
Heglig Crisis (2012)	South Sudan; JEM SPLM-N	Sudan	Sudanese victory: South Sudanese withdrawal from Heglig; Agreement on borders and natural resources signed on 26 September	Salva Kiir
South Sudanese Civil War (2013–2020)	South Sudan: SPLA; Air Force; Mathiang Anyoor; Maban Defence Force; Allied militias: SSLM; SRF: JEM (Note: The SPLM-IO accused JEM of supporting Kiir's government since 2013, though JEM has denied any involvement and claims to maintain neutrality in the South Sudanese Civil War. The Sudanese government, aid workers and other sources have however affirmed that JEM is taking part in conflict on the side of the South Sudanese government.); SPLM-N (alleged); SLA-AW; SLA-MM; EUPF (alleged); State allies: Uganda; Egypt (alleged)	(United Nations) UNMISS: (United Nations) Regional Protection Force; Rwanda; Ethiopia; (South Sudan) SPLM-IO; Nuer White Army (South Sudan) SSDM: Cobra Faction (Note: The Cobra Faction openly opposed the government until 2014, and remained in relative opposition until 2015, when it divided into a pro-government and pro-SPLM-IO faction, the latter of which formed the Greater Pibor Forces. In early 2016, the Cobra Faction effectively disbanded, when the remaining group joined the government. In September 2016, however, the Cobra Faction was declared restored by some of its commanders and declared that it had resumed its struggle against the government.); Greater Pibor Forces (since 2015); (South Sudan) Agwelek forces; TFNF; SSFDP; South Sudan National Army; NAS; Arrow Boys (since Nov. 2015); Wau State insurgents SSOA (until September 2018); SSOMA/NSSSOG (until Jan. 2020); Supported by: Sudan (South Sudanese gov. claim)	Stalemate: Unity government formed; Three Special Administrative Areas created; Ethnic violence in South Sudan continues	Salva Kiir

== Sources ==
- Bassil, Noah (2013). The Post-Colonial State and Civil War in Sudan: The Origins of Conflict in Darfur. London; New York: I.B. Tauris. ISBN 978-1780760858.
- Connell, Dan (August 1998). "Sudan: Global Trade, Local Impact. Arms Transfers to all Sides in the Civil War in Sudan" (PDF). Human Rights Watch. 10 (4 (A)).
- Craze, Joshua; Tubiana, Jérôme; Gramizzi, Claudio (2016). Emile LeBrun (ed.). "A State of Disunity: Conflict Dynamics in Unity State, South Sudan, 2013–15" (PDF). HSBA Working Paper (42). Geneva: Small Arms Survey. ISBN 978-2-940548-32-3.
- DeRouen, Karl R.; Heo, Uk (2007). Civil wars of the world: major conflicts since World War II. Vol. 1. ABC-CLIO.
- de Waal, Alex (April 2007). "Sudan: international dimensions to the state and its crisis" (PDF). Occasional Papers (Crisis States Research Centre) (2). ISSN 1753-3082.
- Khalid, Mansour (2010) [1st pub. 2003]. War & Peace in the Sudan. London; New York: Routledge. ISBN 978-0-7103-0663-0.
- LeRiche, Matthew; Arnold, Matthew (2013). South Sudan: From Revolution to Independence. Oxford: Oxford University Press. ISBN 978-0-19-933340-0.
- Leopold, Mark (2001). "'Trying to Hold Things Together?' International NGOs caught up in an Emergency in North-Western Uganda, 1996–97". In Ondine Barrow; Michael Jennings (eds.). The Charitable Impulse: NGOs & Development in East & North-East Africa. Oxford, Bloomfield: James Curry Ltd; Kumarian Press. pp. 94–108. ISBN 9781565491373.
- Martell, Peter (2018). First Raise a Flag. London: Hurst & Company. ISBN 978-1849049597.
- O'Ballance, Edgar (1977). The Secret War in the Sudan: 1955–1972. London: Faber and Faber. ISBN 0-571-10768-0.
- Plaut, Martin (2016). Understanding Eritrea: Inside Africa's Most Repressive State. Oxford: Oxford University Press. ISBN 978-0-19-066959-1.
- Poggo, Scopas (2009). The First Sudanese Civil War Africans, Arabs, And Israelis In The Southern Sudan, 1955-1972. Palgrave Macmillan. ISBN 9780230607965.
- Prunier, Gérard (July 2004). "Rebel Movements and Proxy Warfare: Uganda, Sudan and the Congo (1986-99)". African Affairs. 103 (412): 359–383. doi:10.1093/afraf/adh050. JSTOR 3518562.
- Prunier, Gérard (2009). Africa's World War: Congo, the Rwandan Genocide, and the Making of a Continental Catastrophe. Oxford: Oxford University Press. ISBN 978-0-19-970583-2.
- "Timeline of Recent Intra-Southern Conflict" (PDF). Geneva: Small Arms Survey. 27 June 2014. Archived from the original on 14 October 2014.
- Vuylsteke, Sarah (December 2018). "Identity and Self-determination: The Fertit Opposition in South Sudan" (PDF). HSBA Briefing Paper. Geneva: Small Arms Survey.

First Sudanese Civil War:

- Assefa, Hizkias. 1987. Mediation of Civil Wars, Approaches and Strategies – The Sudan Conflict. Boulder, Colorado: Westview Press.
- Eprile, Cecil. War and Peace in the Sudan, 1955 – 1972. David and Charles, London. 1974. ISBN 0-7153-6221-6.
- Johnson, Douglas H. 1979. "Book Review: The Secret War in the Sudan: 1955–1972 by Edgar O'Ballance". African Affairs 78 (310):132–7.
- O'Ballance, Edgar. 1977. The Secret War in the Sudan: 1955–1972. Hamden, Connecticut: Archon Books. (Faber and Faber edition ISBN 0-571-10768-0).
- Poggo, Scopas Sekwat. 1999. War and Conflict in Southern Sudan, 1955–1972. PhD Dissertation, University of California, Santa Barbara.
