= Gabriel Tanginye =

Southern Sudanese rebel leader (1960–2017)

- Tang-Ginye in 2007
- Born: Gabriel Gatwech Chan; 1960; Fangak County, Republic of the Sudan
- Died: 5 January 2017 (aged 56–57); Hamra, South Sudan
- Military career
- Conflicts: First Sudanese Civil War; Second Sudanese Civil War; George Athor's rebellion South Sudanese Civil War

Gabriel Gatwech Chan (1960 – 5 January 2017), better known by his nom de guerre Tanginye (meaning "long pipe"), was a South Sudanese military officer and rebel commander of various ethnic Nuer militant groups during the Second Sudanese Civil War and South Sudanese Civil War.

During the South Sudanese Civil War, Tanginye allied with the SPLA-IO and later Lam Akol's militia, a Juba linked rebel group called the National Democratic Movement (NDM) and became its chief of staff. In January 2017, he visited a NDM-allied group, the Tiger Faction New Forces, in the Hamra area in the northern Upper Nile. In course of this visit, the Tigers were attacked by SPLM-IO-affiliated fighters belonging to the militia of John Uliny, and Tanginye was killed in action alongside most of the fighters from the Tigers faction.

Tanginye led a militia in southern Sudan allied to the Khartoum government during the Second Sudanese Civil War. Members of the Sudanese military loyal to Tanginye in Malakal clashed with the Sudan People's Liberation Army (SPLA) in 2006, killing about 150 people, and in 2009 in breach of the peace deal. In April 2011, clashes between his militia and the SPLA in the state of Jonglei killed at least 57 according to government officials. Shortly thereafter, Tanginye surrendered to SPLA forces and was placed under house arrest in Juba awaiting charges against him.

== Early life and role in the Sudanese Civil Wars ==
During the First Sudanese Civil War, Tanginye joined the Anyanya separatist movement as a child soldier. Tanginye disliked the Addis Ababa Agreement that ended the civil war in 1972, thus he joined the predominantly Nuer Anyanya II rebel group. In 1984, during the Second Sudanese Civil War, he and other Anyanya II leaders allied with the Sudanese government in order to fight the Sudan People's Liberation Army (SPLA), predominantly made up of those from the Dinka ethnic group. While large numbers of the Anyanya II defected to the SPLA around 1988, Tanginye and his forces stayed allied to the government. Tanginye and his forces joined the SPLA-Nasir faction after it split from the SPLA in 1991. Tanginye became a part of the South Sudan Defence Forces as part of the Khartoum Peace Agreement of 1997. After the defection of Lam Akol in October 2003, the Sudanese government feared losing the Upper Nile area. They provided Tanginye's forces with boats, trucks, guns, and ammunition, which Tanginye used in a campaign in the modern Western Nile State in 2004 designed to rid the area of SPLA support. The campaign killed hundreds and displaced tens of thousands of civilians through its use of burning and looting villages. Tanginye was made a major general of the Sudanese Armed Forces in 2004. Unlike many of the pro-Sudan militiamen who were integrated into the SPLA, Tanginye did not sign the Juba Declaration of 8 January 2006. However, Brig. John Both did integrate into the SPLA and took about 70 percent of Tanginye's force with him, leaving the remaining forces estimated at less than 500.

== 2005-2011 ==
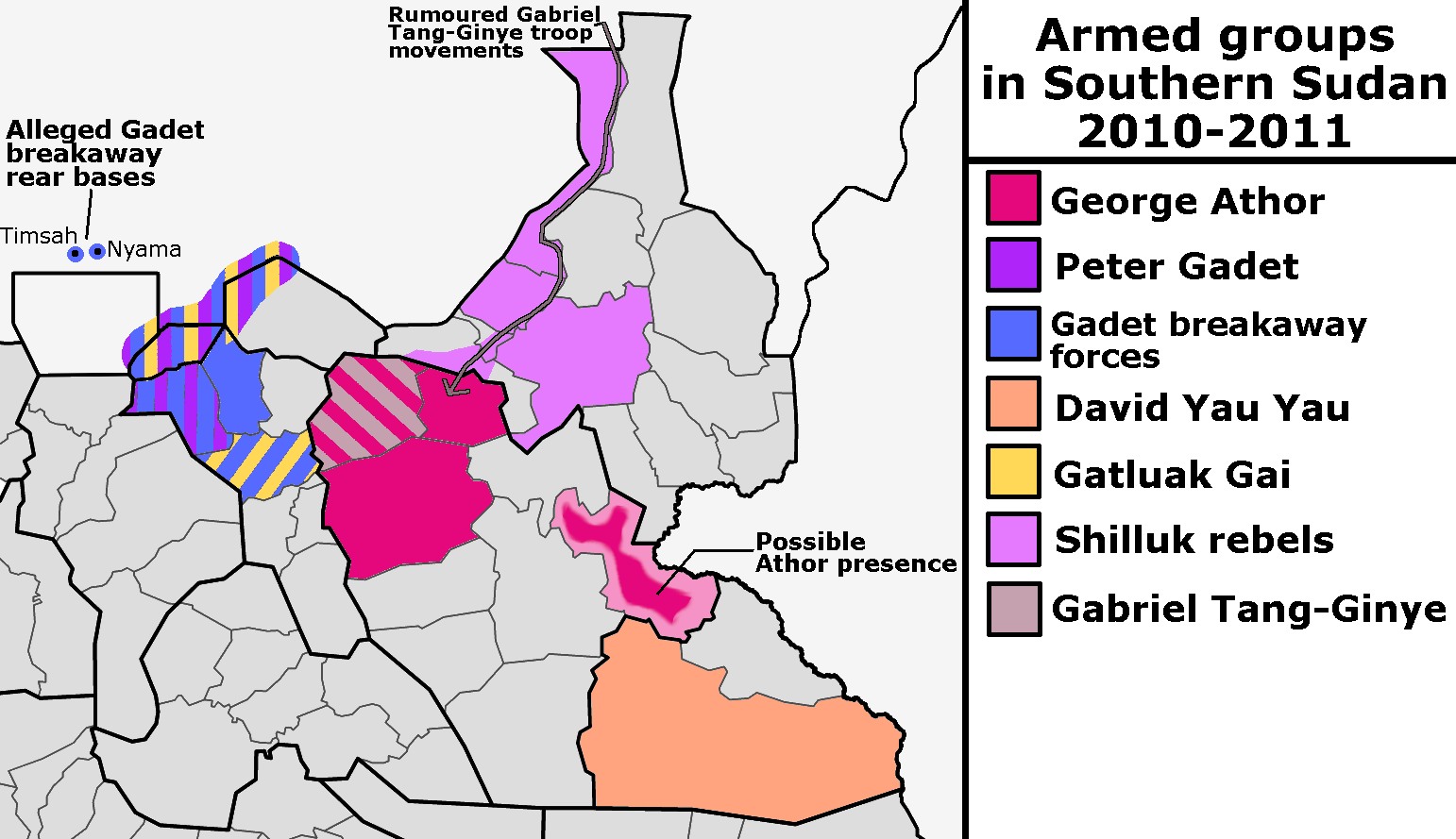
Location of Tanginye's rebellion (in brown) by 2011

After the Comprehensive Peace Agreement ended the Second Sudanese Civil War in 2005, Tanginye's forces became part of the Joint Integrated Units. He mostly stayed in Khartoum, only occasionally visiting the South. In 2006, the SPLA offered Tanginye the post of Commissioner of Fangak, but tensions increased when Tanginye asked to keep his 'personal' SAF forces and SAF position. Clashes broke out between the SAF and SPLA components of the Joint Integrated Unit in Malakal, leaving about 150 dead in the Battle of Malakal. When Tanginye visited Malakal in 2009 to visit relatives, clashes also broke out between units of the SAF that were former members of Tanginye's militia and the SPLA, leaving about 60 dead. In September 2010, Tanginye was offered amnesty by Salva Kiir, and he visited Juba and Bentiu and met with Nuer members of the SPLM. He reportedly agreed to join the SPLA, but remained quiet the following months. Members of the SAF in Malakal Joint Integrated Unit who remained loyal to Tanginye became concerned about their uncertain future, with some opposing the idea of Tanginye joining the SPLA, and in early February 2011 clashes broke out among the SAF units in Malakal, which soon spread to other towns in the Upper Nile State including Paloich. These clashes resulted in about 50 dead. In mid-February 2011, Pagan Amum reported that Tanginye had returned to the South in January with 300 men driving trucks with mounted machine guns supplied by Khartoum. Pagan said that Tanginye was on the move to Fangak County to join George Athor's rebellion. In early April 2011, Tanginye assembled some of his men at Kaldok, Fangak County, supposedly for integration into the SPLA. On 20 April, an officer who refused to integrate his forces was killed. On 23–24 April, Tanginye's forces clashed with SPLA troops commanded by Brig. Gen. Gatwich Gai, leaving 7 SPLA and 57 of Tanginye's men dead. On 25 April, Tanginye and 1,300 of his men surrendered to the SPLA. He was then placed under house arrest in Juba.

== Independent South Sudan ==
Tanginye was still detained when South Sudan gained its independence on 9 July 2011. However, on 7 October 2013, president Salva Kiir pardoned Tanginye and other former militia commanders. On 29 November 2013, Tanginye was appointed a major general in the SPLA. After the start of the South Sudanese Civil War, Tanginye joined the SPLA-IO. Tanginye's Nuer fighters attacked Shilluk settlements in Panykang County during December 2013 and January 2014. Tanginye's fighters were stationed in New Fangak and primarily fought Johnson Olony's Agwelek Forces until they ended their alliance with the SPLA on 14 May 2015. Since then, Olony's forces acted in concert with Tanginye. On 23 June 2015, Tanginye and fellow SPLA-IO general Thomas Mabor Dhol took Malakal from the SPLA's 1st Division in an opportunistic attack with a force composed mainly of troops from Ulang and Fangak counties along with some of Olony's men. In June 2015, Tanginye signed a letter expressing frustration with Riek Machar, and in August 2015 he left the SPLA-IO and joined Gabriel Changson Chang's Federal Democratic Party/South Sudan Armed Forces. Lam Akol then brought Tanginye into his primarily Shilluk National Democratic Movement as its chief of staff, a desperate choice given Tanginye's brutal campaigns against the Shilluk. Tanginye was supposed to go to Fangak to raise troops for the NDM, but in January 2017 he visited a NDM-allied group, the Tiger Faction New Forces, in the Hamra area in the northern Upper Nile. In course of this visit, the Tigers were attacked by SPLM-IO-affiliated fighters belonging to the militia of John Uliny, and Tanginye was killed alongside most of the Tigers.

== See also ==
- Battle of Malakal
- George Athor's rebellion
- Peter Gadet
