= Tiger Faction New Forces =

South Sudanese rebel group

- Leader: Maj. Gen. Yoanis Okiech †
- Spokesperson: Brig. Gen. Otowang Achwang
- Dates active: 29 October 2015 – January 2017
- Split from: Sudan People's Liberation Army (SPLA)
- Allegiance: Shilluk Kingdom
- Headquarters: Hamra, near Kodok in Western Upper Nile
- Active regions: Northeastern South Sudan
- Ideology: Shilluk tribalism Pro-South Sudanese federalism
- Part of: National Democratic Movement (from 2016)
- Wars: the South Sudanese Civil War

The Tiger Faction New Forces (short: TFNF, also called Tiger Faction or The Tigers) was a Shilluk militia that took part in the South Sudanese Civil War with the aim of reversing the division of South Sudan into 28 (later 32) states in order to restore the territory of the Shilluk Kingdom per its 1956 borders. Led by Yoanis Okiech, the TFNF originally split from the Sudan People's Liberation Army (SPLA) in late October 2015 and subsequently started an insurgency against the SPLM government. In course of 2016, however, it also came into conflict with SPLM-IO rebels, leading to inter-rebel fighting which resulted in Okiech's death and the group's destruction in January 2017.

== Background ==
Land formally part of the Shilluk Kingdom before the creation of new states in 2015. The TFNF claimed that the lands east of the Nile would be occupied by Dinka as consequence of President Salva Kiir's decree.

The Shilluk are South Sudan's third-largest ethnic group and mostly live in the country's former Upper Nile state. Centuries ago, the Shilluk formed a sophisticated and powerful kingdom, which has survived to the present day even though it lost its independence during the 19th century. Wary of any outside powers, the Shilluk are much more loyal to each other, their monarchy and their lands than to South Sudan, as the "fertile floodplains of the Nile River, after all, have done more for them than any government ever has". Upon the outbreak of the South Sudanese Civil War, the Shilluk militias mostly sided with the Dinka-dominated government; this changed, however, when President Salva Kiir decided to increase the number of South Sudan's states to 28 in mid-2015. This move was widely denounced by Shilluk as attempt to divide their homeland, driving several Shilluk militias into armed rebellion.

== Foundation and independent operations ==
The beginnings of the Tiger Faction New Forces are tied to Yoanis Okiech, one of the leading Shilluk commanders in South Sudan's army, the Sudan People's Liberation Army (SPLA). Okiech initially remained loyal to the government when Shilluk elements in the SPLA, most notably John Uliny's Agwelek forces, rebelled in May 2015. Nevertheless, the government did not trust him and put him under house arrest while his troops remained in Manyo County in northern Upper Nile State, from which they had driven SPLM-IO rebels in early 2015. Okiech consequently expressed sympathy for Uliny's uprising, and when the President finally decreed the creation of new states in October 2015, he and his forces mutinied. At the time, Okiech's superior, Major General Ayok Ogat, had left his soldiers for Juba, an opportunity which Okiech used to launch surprise attacks on SPLA loyalists at Wadakona and Tor Gwang in Manyo County on 29 October 2015. The government claimed that Okiech's followers numbered just 90 men and that their first attacks had failed, whereas the rebels said that their assaults had been a success.

The Tiger Faction New Forces controlled much of northern Western Nile State (pictured) in early 2016

On 30 October, Okiech officially announced the formation of the "Tiger Faction New Forces". The declared intention of the new group was to reverse the division of the Shilluk Kingdom through the creation of new states, which TFNF considered an unconstitutional move by the "corrupt clique in Juba" with the aim of giving Shilluk lands to Dinka. Although there had been reports that the TFNF subsequently joined Uliny's Agwelek forces, the Tigers in fact remained independent, though began to cooperate closely with the Agwelek forces, and, by extension, the SPLM-IO. Attacking loyalist forces at Wadakona, Gabat, Mananmand Ajot, Nyanowar, and Tor Gwang, the TFNF expanded its area of control. Although the Tigers were not powerful enough to capture the strategically significant town of Renk, they controlled much of northern Western Nile State by early 2016, also thanks to widespread support by local Shilluk civilians. In turn, the SPLA launched numerous counter-attacks against the TFNF between October 2015 and February 2016.

== Joining the NDM and destruction ==
The SPLM-IO attempted to convince the TFNF to officially join them in March 2016, but their offer to appoint Okiech as commander of the "Special Brigade One" was rebuffed. The TFNF explained their refusal with the readiness of the SPLM-IO to negotiate a peace agreement with the government. In contrast, the Tigers refused to end their insurgency as long as the Shilluk Kingdom was not restored per its 1956 borders. The TFNF instead joined the National Democratic Movement (NDM), a Shilluk rebel group formed by Lam Akol. As the NDM is a rival to the SPLM-IO, hostilities consequently grew between the Tigers and the SPLM-IO-affiliated Agwelek forces, leading to inter-rebel fighting.

In January 2017, the SPLM-IO forces in Western Upper Nile launched a major campaign against the local NDM affiliates, leading to fierce clashes between the two sides in the area around Hamra, a small village near Kodok. Although a first attack by the SPLM-IO was reportedly repulsed, troops under Uliny's command later overran Okiech's headquarters in the area. In course of the fighting Gen. Gabriel Gatwech Chan (a.k.a. "Tanginye"), a senior NDM commander and personal friend of Okiech, was killed alongside his two sons and at least 20 militants. Okiech was wounded and barely escaped alive, while his remaining forces mostly scattered. John Uliny's men continued to pursue him, and eventually cornered Okiech at Thoroji, in northern Upper Nile near the border to Sudan. There, they killed him and 27 of his bodyguards in a shootout on 7 January 2017. The SPLM-IO went on to claim that with this victory, Okiech's forces were completely destroyed.

Although elements of the NDM remained active in the Upper Nile region, the deaths of Okiech and Gabriel Tang permanently reduced the NDM's ability to expand in the area. Upper Nile thus remained dominated by the SPLM-IO.
