= Arok Thon Arok =

South Sudanese revolutionary and politician

Arok Thon Arok (died 12 February 1998) was a politician from Southern Sudan. He was one of five senior commanders of the Sudan People's Liberation Army (SPLA), before defecting.

== Early life ==
Arok was a Twic Dinka from the community of Kongor in Twic East County, Jonglei State. He was said to be related to John Garang.

== Career ==
Arok attended military school in Khartoum.

He was a major in the SPAF, working as an intelligence officer in the 13th Brigade in Upper Nile.

He and others founded Sudan People's Liberation Army (SPLA) in 1983. He was one of five senior commanders on the Permanent Political Military Office of the SPLA: John Garang, Kerubino Kuanyin Bol, William Nyuon Bany, and Salva Kiir being the others. He was senior in rank to all of the others apart from Garang, and served for four years as a member of the Political-Military High Command and as Deputy Chief of Staff for Administration and Logistics. In 1984, he was part of a delegation visiting Libya to buy arms.

He was in Kongor in 1984 to 1985 as the regional commander for Mading Bor. He almost died of thirst between Juba and Mading Bor when he and his troops travelled in an area where there was no water. He was succeeded by Commander Kuol Manyang Juuk as the leader in Mading Bor.

Arok's wife died in 1987, and, in 1988, he visited England to place his children in school there, where it was reported that he undertook secret negotiations with SPAF General Burma Nasir. When word got back to Garang, he expelled Arok from the SPLA and briefly imprisoned, along with Kerubino. Arok went to Uganda, where he was placed under house arrest by Museveni before being released in February 1993. They were eventually given status as refugees, and went to Kenya, where they joined an SPLA breakaway faction formed in 1991 headed by former SPLA Commander Riek Machar, a movement later called the South Sudan Independence Movement/Army.

By March 1993, there were four factions opposing Garang. Initially, they comprised a "Unity" group, but this fell apart. The factions were led by the following men:

1. Bany and Joseph Oduhu
2. Riek Machar and Lam Akol (Nasir Group)
3. Kerubino and others (Bahr el-Ghazal Group)
4. Arok (Bor Citizens Group)

In the 1990s, Arok returned to Khartoum, and, in April 1996, Machar, Kerubino and Arok signed a "Political Charter" with the Sudanese Government in Khartoum.

== Death ==
Arok died in the 1998 Sudan Air Force crash at Nasir. Others killed included the vice-president of Sudan, Major General Zubair Mohamed Salih, and several other political and military leaders.
