= Battle of Malakal =

Battle

Coordinates: 9.55°N 31.65°E

- Part of the aftermath of the Second Sudanese Civil War
- Location of Malakal in pre-2011 Sudan
Date	27–29 November 2006 (3 days)
Location	Malakal, Southern Sudan Autonomous Region, Sudan
Result	Ceasefire and mutual disengagement to pre-battle positions

Belligerents
Sudan; SSDF	Southern Sudan; SPLA

Commanders and leaders
Gabriel Tang	Unknown

Casualties and losses
Unknown	At least 4 killed
- ~150 killed and 400–500 wounded

The Battle of Malakal occurred at the end of November 2006 in the southern Sudanese town of Malakal. The clashes between Sudanese government forces and the Sudan People's Liberation Army were the most serious breach of a 2005 deal to end the Second Sudanese Civil War.

== Battle ==
According to the SPLA, militia leader Gabriel Tang initiated the clashes by attacking the SPLA and then taking refuge in the local Sudanese Army base. After a demand to hand over Tang was not met, the SPLA attacked the base, causing the Sudanese army to counterattack with tanks. The Sudanese army likewise blamed the SPLA for starting the battle. After three days of fighting the battle eventually subsided, and both sides agreed to disengage to their pre-battle positions.

== Aftermath ==
Tang's militia would clash with the SPLA again in Malakal in 2009 and in Jonglei in 2011, before eventually surrendering to the SPLA shortly thereafter. The 2006 clash didn't escalate to a dangerous level, and the 2011 South Sudanese independence referendum was held as planned and according to the Comprehensive Peace Agreement of 2005, resulting in South Sudan's independence.
