= Peter Adwok Nyaba =

South Sudan activist and researcher

- Born: Shilluk
- Citizenship: South Sudan
- Education: Catholic missionary school
- Occupations: Civil society advocate and researcher
- Notable work: The Politics of Liberation in South Sudan
- Spouse: Abuk Payiti Ayik

Peter Adwok Nyaba is a South Sudanese activist. He is a civil society advocate and researcher who has conducted numerous studies for international humanitarian organizations working in South Sudan. He went on to be Minister for Higher Education in the Government of South Sudan from 2011 to 2013.

== Early life and education ==
He is from Chollo in Shilluk and was educated in a Catholic missionary school.

For a short period, Nyaba took part in the First Sudanese Civil War from 1964 to 1966, after which he went on to resume his studies at the University of Khartoum.

== Career ==
Nyaba's work focuses on international humanitarian organizations in South Sudan, with a focus on governance, conflict, and social development.

== Political involvement ==
Nyaba has played an active role in South Sudan's political landscape, contributing to debates on liberation movements, state formation, and democratic governance.

== Works ==
- The Politics of Liberation in South Sudan
