= Relief Association of Southern Sudan =

Disestablished humanitarian organization in Sudan

The Relief Association of Southern Sudan (abbreviated RASS) was a humanitarian organization in Sudan, operating during the Second Sudanese Civil War. It was the humanitarian wing of the forces of Riek Machar 1991-2003 (initially SPLA-Nasir/United and, later, SSIM/A, SSDF, SPDF). SPLA-Nasir set up RASS to function as a local civilian authority, and for liaisons with United Nations agencies and NGOs. As of 1999, Simon Kun served as executive director of RASS.

RASS was set up by the SPLA-Nasir/United, almost immediately after the revolt inside the 1991 Sudan People's Liberation Army against the leadership of Dr. John Garang. RASS remained closely tied to the SPLA-Nasir military structure and only worked in areas under the control of Riek Machar's forces. RASS staff were generally former fighters and commanders of the movement. During its early phase, RASS was headed by Riek Gai Kok. Later, Timothy Tutlam took over as RASS director. He remained in this position until he died in the 1998 Sudan Air Force crash.

RASS competed with the SPLA relief wing, the Sudan Relief and Rehabilitation Association (SRRA), over access to food distribution. RASS became a partner of the Operation Lifeline Sudan. In cooperation with international NGOs and agencies, RASS carried out food distributions. However, the RASS did not possess the organizational capacity to manage the volumes of food aid allocated to it, resulting in periodic misuse of donated food items.

In 1998 the SSDF admitted the presence of children amongst its fighters, and agreed to participate in a program organised by UNICEF and Swedish Save the Children to demobilize child soldiers. RASS and the Swedish Save the Children began operating a transit camp at Thonyor, near Ler, for some 280 former child soldiers. However, the activities of the camp were interrupted as fighting broke out in the area in 1999. Most of the children were later relocated by RASS and Swedish Save the Children in August 2000 at Nyal.

RASS merged with the SRRA in 2003 forming a unified relief organization tied to the SPLA/M, the SRRC.
