= Nahid Gabrallah =

Nahid Gabralla
- ناهد جبرالله
- Born: Malakal, South Sudan
- Education: University of Khartoum
- Known for: Human Rights Activism
- Movement: No-to-Women's-Oppression
- Awards: Champions of Human Rights Medal

Nahid Gabrallah Seidahmed (Arabic: ناهد جبرالله) is a Sudanese Human rights activist, director of Seema Center. and Nominated for Human Rights Tulip award.

== Early life ==
She born in Malakal, South Sudan and lived in Singa, Khartoum, Malakal, Maloot, Alobaid, Jabl Awliaa, where she got her primary and intermediate studies due to her father's work in the Sudanese Post Office Corporation.

== Career ==
Nahid worked for women and (young) girls and victims of Gender Based Violence.

She started activism in the high school when she joined the democratic front for students. She had participated in the student movements that were calling for democracy and students rights, and because of her activism she was suspended from school for several days, she had then joined the faculty of Science in the University of Khartoum where she continued her political and social activities.

During that period she was elected as a member in the faculty's association for two terms. She was also elected for Khartoum University Students Union (KUSU), term 1984 - 1985, representing the democratic front in the Coalition of the Nationalist Parties, and had been the first female to serve as a secretary-general of it.

Nahid was arrested in March 1985 for her political activities and was released a day after the 1985 revolution. After her graduation in 1989, the authorities denied her job opportunities and created constraints against her right to make a livelihood, and that was due to her activism, in 2004 she obtained her high diploma in human rights from the University of Khartoum.

In 2008 she founded Seema Center for Training and Protection of Women and Children's Rights, a nonprofit organization aiming to protect women and children, which for many years has provided support to women and girls in situations of violence and social aggression, and also aiming at filling the huge gap in service-provision for victims of violence.

In 2009, Nahid co-founded No-To-Women's-Oppression initiative to fight against the public order laws.

== Awards ==
- Champions of Human Rights Medal, Delegation of the European Union to Sudan, 2018
