= Aguil Chut-Deng =

South Sudanese revolutionary and activist (1967–2022)

- Born: 1967; Malakal, Sudan (present day South Sudan)
- Died: c. 26 April 2022 (aged 55); Brisbane, Australia
- Other name: Nyanpakou
- Education: University of Southern Queensland

Aguil Chut Deng Acouth (1967 – c. 26 April 2022), also known as Aguil de'Chut Deng or Aguil Chut-Deng, was a South Sudanese revolutionary and activist. She was a member of "Katiba Banat", the women's battalion of the Sudan People's Liberation Army (SPLA), during the Second Sudanese Civil War.

As a refugee in Australia, she founded the Sudanese Australian International Activist Group, and took part in rallies to raise awareness of the conflict. After the independence of South Sudan in 2011, she founded South Sudanese Women Advocacy for Peace. She also focused on issues faced by South Sudanese refugees in Australia.

== Early life ==
Aguil Chut Deng was born in 1967 (Note: Some sources reported 1964) in Malakal, located in what is now the state of Upper Nile, South Sudan. She was the second of seven children born to Dinka parents. Her father Chut Deng Achouth had studied medical sciences and worked at a government hospital in Khartoum. Her mother Achol Aguin Majok, a homemaker, was illiterate. Around 1979, the family moved from Khartoum to Juba when her father was reassigned to the hospital there. In Juba, they all lived in a one-room dwelling.

In 1983, her father died. He was believed to be poisoned by the man who was assigned to replace him at the hospital. While the rest of the family left Juba for her mother's village, Deng and her older brother stayed to attend school. She was married in the village.

== Army ==
In 1984, Deng left her studies to join the Sudan People's Liberation Army (SPLA). The Second Sudanese Civil War had begun shortly before. She became a member of "Katiba Banat", the all-female battalion, where her nom de guerre was "Nyanpakou". She provided medical support to the SPLA and learned how to fight in preparation for attacks.

Due to increased fighting, Deng was eventually responsible for 22 children from her extended family; she and her battalion friends took the children to a United Nations refugee camp in Itang, Ethiopia, in order to attend school. They fed and clothed the children, also organizing school supplies. When the Ethiopian government collapsed in 1991, the SPLA groups there went into hiding. Around this time, Deng began suffering blackouts, due to an (unknown) blood clot in her brain. Her group traveled across the border to Kenya, where she received treatment in Nairobi. She also began learning English, in order to tell about her family's experience in case she survived.

== Refugee ==
In 1996, Deng and her extended family were granted refugee status in Australia, where she was able to have the clot removed. Her family was among the first South Sudanese refugees to settle in Toowoomba. She studied at the University of Southern Queensland, focusing on improving her English. As she saw that Australians were largely unaware of the Sudanese war, Deng began speaking publicly. In 2000, she moved to Canberra to lobby the government to take more South Sudanese refugees, joining refugee rallies to represent South Sudan. She traveled to the U.S., the U.K., and Germany to speak about South Sudan. Back in Australia, she founded the Sudanese Australian International Activist Group to connect refugees to local communities and their government. Besides informing the public about the war, the Group helped refugees resettle and find jobs.

== Activism ==
After the Naivasha agreement was signed in 2005, ending the war, Deng became active in promoting the Sudan People's Liberation Movement (SPLM) and educating the South Sudanese in Australia about the provisions of the agreement. She addressed the 2007 General Debate session of the UNHCR Executive Committee. As an ACT delegate, she participated in the Security Prosperity working group of the Australia 2020 Summit. In recognition of her work, she was nominated to the SPLM National Liberation Council as the representative of the diaspora in Australia and Oceania. She also campaigned for diaspora participation in the 2011 South Sudanese independence referendum. When political fighting erupted in 2013, she joined with civil society leaders to advocate for peace, and founded South Sudanese Women Advocacy for Peace. She participated in the IGAD-led peace process.

Deng continued to travel between South Sudan and Australia. She recognized the symptoms of family breakdown in the refugee communities, and advocated for cooperation among community members in raising children to minimize government intervention orders.

In an interview with the Special Broadcasting Service released on 30 April 2022, Deng spoke of corruption allegations against former government ministers.

== Death ==
On 26 April 2022, Deng left her house in Brisbane for her daily exercise, but did not return home. After being reported missing the following day, she was found dead in a wooded area by the Queensland Police Service on 30 April 2022. As of 3 May 2022, the coroner's report has not yet been released. President Salva Kiir published a message of condolence to her husband, SPLA General Biar Madiing Biar Yaak, and her surviving four children. The Lost Boys and Girls Memorial Foundation began a GoFundMe campaign with Deng's family to bury her in South Sudan. A funeral was held in Australia on 28 May. She then received a state funeral upon arrival in South Sudan in June 2022, where she was buried in Heroes' Cemetery. According to an interview with her family by the Brisbane Times, Deng took her own life.

== See also ==
- List of solved missing person cases (2020s)
- List of unsolved deaths
