= Abuk Payiti Ayik =

South Sudanese politician

Member of the Transitional National Legislative Assembly
- Constituency: Malakal County, Upper Nile State

Personal details
- Party: Sudan People's Liberation Movement
- Spouse: Peter Adwok Nyaba
- Children: Keni Peter Adwok Nyaba
- Occupation: Politician
- Known for: Advocacy for women's rights during the South Sudan peace process
- Committees: Chair, Gender, Social Welfare, Youth & Sports Committee; Chair, Health Committee

Abuk Payiti Ayik is a South Sudanese politician. She is a member of the country's Transitional National Legislative Assembly, representing the Sudan People's Liberation Movement and leading the Gender, Social Welfare, Youth, and Sports Committee.

Payiti was involved in promoting women's rights during the peace process before South Sudan's independence.

== Political career ==
Before independence, Abuk Payiti represented Malakal, a Sudanese border area that was disputed between north and south, in the Southern Sudan Legislative Assembly. She was also involved with the body's gender committee.

She helped advocate for women's needs throughout the peace process and during the writing of the Comprehensive Peace Agreement with the government of Sudan.

Payiti is affiliated with the Sudan People's Liberation Movement and has been involved with its Women Commission.

== Transitional political career ==
After independence, she became a representative of Malakal County in Upper Nile State in the National Legislative Assembly. She has served in the legislature as chair of the committee on Gender, Social Welfare, Youth & Sports and later as chair of the Health committee.

== Political positions and public work ==
As an advocate for women's rights, Payiti has also been involved in the South Sudan Women General Association and Sudanese Women Empowerment for Peace, serving as director of the latter's gender desk for the southern sector.

The Sudan Tribune describes her as "a quiet but conservative lawmaker."

== Personal life ==
Payiti is married to Peter Adwok Nyaba, a fellow politician who previously served as the country's minister of higher education, science, and technology. He was arrested in 2013 and placed under house arrest, eventually fleeing to exile in Nairobi.

Her daughter Keni Peter Adwok Nyaba was a diplomat for South Sudan.
