= 2023 Malakal refugee camp clashes =

- Part of Ethnic violence in South Sudan
Date	June 8, 2023
Location	Malakal Protection of Civilians site, Malakal, South Sudan
Result	Displacement of Nuers

Belligerents
Nuer militias	Shilluk militias

Casualties and losses
- 20 civilians killed 20+ injured Hundreds to thousands displaced

On June 8, 2023, clashes broke out at a UNMISS-run refugee camp in Malakal, South Sudan between two different groups of civilians. At least 13 civilians were killed and 20 more were injured in the clashes.

== Background ==
Malakal is home to a United Nations-run refugee camp that houses at least 50,000 people displaced during the South Sudanese Civil War and subsequent ethnic conflicts. After the war in Sudan broke out on April 15, 2023, another 25,000 people sought refuge at the camp. Clashes over limited resources between different armed groups, usually from different ethnic groups, have occurred before like in 2016, when 18 people were killed at the camp. Nuer and Shilluk refugees are the dominant ethnic groups displaced to Malakal, and they settle in the camp while Dinka settle in the city of Malakal. There are few resources at the very crowded camp.

== Clashes ==
The source of the clashes was a tussle between two groups of women grabbing water from a site in the camp. Shortly afterward, one young man was stabbed to death as a result of the water dispute. On June 8, Nuer and Shilluk militias fought inside the camp to enact revenge on the stabbed victim. At least 20 people were killed in the first spate of clashes, and dozens more were injured. Several hundred families fled the camp amid the fighting.

Nuer residents torched their homes and fled north of Malakal to seek shelter elsewhere. Some Nuer joined the Nuer White Army. The area where many Nuer fled along the Upper Nile is the location of land conflicts between Dinka, Nuer, and Shilluk.

== Aftermath ==
The United Nations was able to restore calm in the camp after June 8. By July, around 6,000 people displaced from the camp returned to it and the surrounding area. On June 20, a drunk man with a machete injured two others, causing several hundred families to flee thinking fighting had restarted.
