= Justice Party (Sudan) =

- Founder: Dr. Lam Akol; Amin Benani; Ali Maki Bilail
- Founded: 2002
- Dissolved: 2003

The Justice Party (Arabic: حزب العدالة) was a Sudanese Party formed by the defectors from the ruling NCP party in 2002 by former Justice minister, Amin Benani, former national Transport minister, Dr. Lam Akol Ajawin, and former presidential Advisor for peace, Ali Maki Bilail.
