= William Nyuon Bany =

South Sudanese revolutionary and politician

William Nyuon Bany (d. 13 January 1996) was a South Sudanese soldier and politician. He was one of the founding members of the Sudan People's Liberation Army (SPLA) during the Second Sudanese Civil War. He was appointed third-in-command after John Garang and Kerubino Kuanyin Bol. In September 1992 he defected from the SPLA to join another faction under Riek Machar, but he rejoined the SPLA before he was assassinated on 13 January 1996. Today he is remembered as a hero by many South Sudanese people, as well as the president, Salva Kiir.

== Early life ==
William Nyuon Bany was a Nuer man who was also related to the Dinka people. He spoke Nuer, Arabic, Amharic, and some English.

== Military career ==
When war broke out in a southern town of Bor, Bany served as a major in the Sudanese army in Ayot. He served as a commander in Sudan for a long time before he started a rebellion in 1983.

Bany and Kerubino Kwanyin Bol were founding members of SPLA, before John Garang joined them. Bany was appointed the 3rd high-ranking Commander after Bol. Commander Salva Kiir was the 4th. Bany was also the Chief of Staff.

While he worked as a commander of the SPLA he lived in Itang, a small Ethiopian town in the Gambela Region.

=== SPLA dissent ===
In August 1991 there was a split between the SPLM/A-Torit faction and SPLA-Nasir, with SPLA-Nasir led by Lam Akol Ajawin. SPLA-Nasir accused Garang of ruling by force, in a "dictatorial reign of terror"; but ethnic rivalry seemed to have a part, with the Nasir faction mainly composed of Nuer, and Garang's supporters mainly Dinka people. Months of fighting between the two factions left thousands dead in early 1992. The SPLA-Nasir also raised the idea of an independent south (whereas Garang wanted unity).

On 10 May 1992 Bany was met by the Nigerian Independent National Electoral Commission (INEC) Chairman under Nigerian President Ibrahim Babangida in Abuja, to discuss the need for unifying the two delegations. An agreement was signed the following day, known as the "Abuja II Peace agreement".

=== Defection from SPLA ===
On 14 September 1992, Bany, who was at the time Deputy Commander-in-Chief of the SPLA and Deputy Chairman of the SPLM, announced his defection from the SPLA. It is alleged that he was offered money by Khartoum, the seat of the Sudanese government, to do so. Bany left the SPLA headquarter in Pageri, escaped Garang-held territory and formed another faction, Forces of Unity (?). The following day, Commander Salva Kiir was promoted from Chief of Staff to Bany's old positions of Deputy Commander-in-Chief and Deputy Chairman.

In October 1993, Bany's forces were defeated. He withdrew to Lafon, where he joined forces with Riek Machar and Lam Akol, who had attempted a coup in August 1991 and brought about an ethnic civil war within the SPLA in the Nasir region, with heavy civilian casualties. Fighting went on in the Lafon area between the SPLA and Machar and Bany's group. Children were recruited to the ranks of the various factions, and a group of Nuer boys were lured from their families by the promise of education only to end up in a camp run by Bany in Magire in Eastern Equatoria state. Fighting continued throughout 1993 and 1994.

=== SPLA-United ===
In February 1993, a third faction, known as the Kerubino group was formed, after Bol and several others escaped from a Garang prison. On 5 April 1993, at a press conference in Nairobi, the three rebel factions announced a coalition, to be called "Sudanese People's Liberation Army-United", known as SPLA-United, which included a number of former Garang officials and other southerners.

In early 1994, under both domestic and international pressure owing to heavy casualties exacerbated by famine, SPLA-United agreed to a cease-fire in which Garang agreed to self-determination for the south, an idea which had gained popularity. There was rivalry between SPLA-United's Machar and Garang in their respective leadership roles. In April 1994, a conference was called, the first since 1983, of about 500 delegates, in order to support and consolidate Garang's leadership, against SPLA-United. In July 1994, Bany was third in command of SPLA-United after Riek Machar and Bol.

=== Back to SPLA ===
In early 1995, Machar of the Nasir faction split to form the SSIM, Southern Sudan Independence Movement, formally launched on 11–12 March 1995. Bany was expelled from SPLA-United for his alleged collaboration with Khartoum (government of Sudan), at which he supported a pro-Garang stance within the SSIM – but later both groups changed to support unity anyway. Machar led an anti-SPLA faction, while Bany led a pro-SPLA faction within the SSIM.

On 31 March 1995, a group of junior officers talked Bany into rejoining the SPLA, and contact was made with Garang and Kiir. On 27 April 1995 "The Lafon Declaration" was made confirming Bany's return to the SPLA/M. A few weeks later, Bany apologised for his actions and expressed gratitude that Commander Salva Kiir had given up his position as the Deputy to allow Bany to resume his duties in this position. He went on to fight vigorously for the SPLA/M.

In May 1995, Bany, who was sacked earlier that year by SSIM/A leader Machar, "was sent out from the government garrison at Magiri with ten armoured vehicles to rescue the captured convoy, but instead joined forces with the rebels", in March 1995. He and Bol, who had also been dismissed, were reinstated in their posts. It referred to "personal animosities" among leaders, and failure to control inter-tribal feuding, which had damaged the rebel forces' effectiveness. Bol, Bany and Arok Thon Arok had at various times cooperated with government forces, which led to accusations of treachery.

=== Human rights abuses during the war ===
Human Rights Watch (HRW) published an extensive report in June 1994, detailing human rights abuses by all parties during the war in Southern Sudan, including by the government as well as by the various factions of the SPLA. There was forced recruitment of not only adults, but also child soldiers; arbitrary detention; torture; disappearances; and stealing food and looting from civilians. At the end of the war, there was lack of due process as well as inadequate investigations and accountability for the abuses.

Those responsible for the killing of three expatriate aid workers and a Norwegian journalist in late 1992 have never been brought to account. The factions pointed the finger at each other. The 1994 HRW document reported that John Garang had admitted that his forces "might" have been responsible, although an alternative theory about Bany's forces having been responsible had not been completely abandoned.

A September 1995 HRW report described Nyuon's involvement running a military camp to training boys who had been lured from their homes under false pretences.

In 1997 Amnesty International published a report about Joseph Kony's Lord's Resistance Army (LRA) insurgency in northern Uganda, which had been abducting Ugandans. It was alleged that the Sudan Government was providing food and military assistance to the LRA, a Christian extremist and Acholi nationalist organisation, using the LRA as a militia to attack the SPLA, because the SPLA was being supported by the Uganda Government. The Amnesty report said that in 1994, arms were being channelled through Bany's SPLA faction SPLA-United. "However, by August 1994 Sudan army regular soldiers were directly involved".

== Death and legacy ==
Nyuon Bany was killed by Machar's forces on 13 January 1996, at Gul.

He is regarded as a patriot and a hero by many South Sudanese people, media, and politicians.

A conference hall in the South Sudan State House was named after Bany.

=== Family ===
Nyuon Bany, who had twelve wives, is survived by a number of widows and children, most of whom live in the United States of America. One of his widows, Abuoch, was a main speaker during Martyrs' Day celebrations in Juba in 2012, in the presence of (now President of South Sudan) Salva Kiir.

Salva Kiir married one of Bany's daughters, Aluel William Nyuon Bany, in a traditional wedding around 2004. This later caused public strife between her and Kiir's eldest daughter, Christina Adut Nardes.

One of his daughters, Nyagoa Nyuon, returned to South Sudan after spending about 10 years in the US. In 2013, she co-founded The William Nyuon Bany Foundation, which supports programs fostering children's education and focuses on "improving the health and livelihoods of the communities and building the leadership capacity youth for a prosperous country". The William Nyuon Bany Foundation (WNBF) is a non-profit organisation based in Juba. It provides humanitarian assistance in the fields of education, gender-based violence, health and nutrition. As of September 2026 Machar Deng William Nyuon is executive director.

One of his daughters is Nyadol Nyuon, prominent lawyer and human rights advocate in Melbourne, Australia.
