= The National Democratic Movement (South Sudan) =

South Sudanese political party

National Democratic Movement
- Arabic name: الحركة الوطنية الديمقراطية
- Abbreviation: NDM
- Chairman: Dr. Lam Akol Ajawin

NDM is the National Democratic Movement founded in 2016 by the former South Sudan minister of agriculture Dr. Lam Akol Ajawin, with ideologies aim to fight against totalitarianism, corruption and ethnicity.
