= Jack McCarthy (cricketer) =

Australian cricketer (1917–1998)

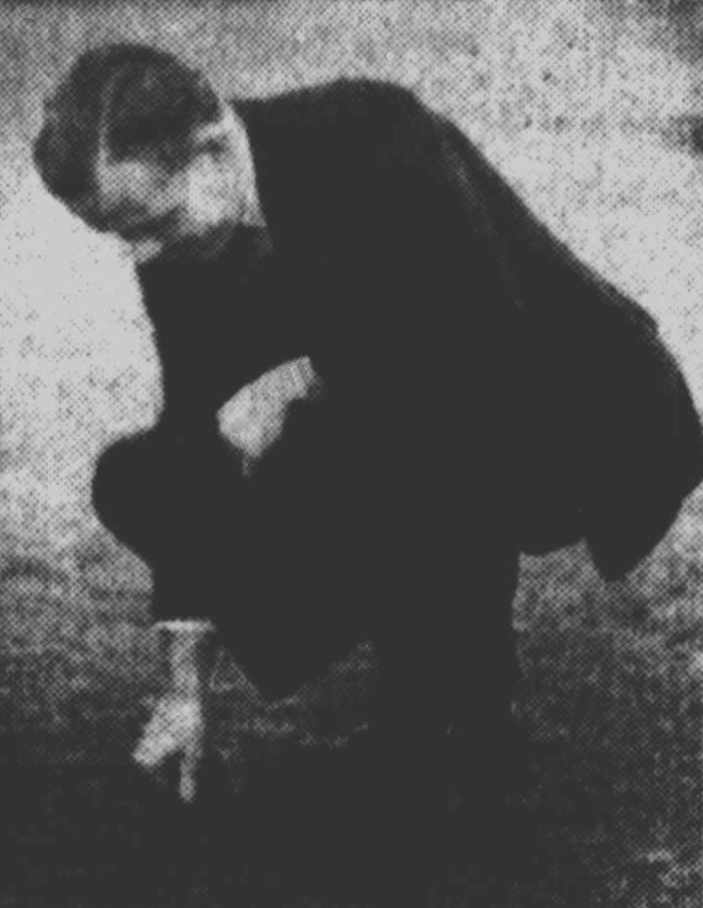
- McCarthy inspecting a wicket in 1941

Personal information
- Full name: John Edward McCarthy
- Born: 22 February 1917; Maryborough, Queensland, Australia
- Died: 18 February 1998 (aged 80); Gold Coast, Queensland, Australia
- Batting: Right-handed
- Bowling: Right-arm medium

Domestic team information
- Years: Team
- 1935/36–1940/41: Queensland

Career statistics
Competition	First-class
Matches	2
Runs scored	71
Batting average	17.75
100s/50s	0/0
Top score	38
Balls bowled	176
Wickets	1
Bowling average	112.00
5 wickets in innings	0
10 wickets in match	0
Best bowling	1/44
Catches/stumpings	2/–
- Source: ESPNcricinfo, 5 October 2020

John Edward McCarthy (22 February 1917 – 18 February 1998) was an Australian cricketer. He played in two first-class matches for Queensland between 1935 and 1941.
