= Keith Christopher =

American singer-songwriter

- Born: Keith Christopher Thomson; April 27, 1957; Portland, Oregon, U.S.
- Died: February 23, 1998 (aged 40); New York City, New York, U.S.
- Occupations: Actor, singer, songwriter, activist

Keith Christopher (April 27, 1957 – February 23, 1998) was an American actor, singer-songwriter and AIDS activist.

== Biography ==
Originally from the Pacific Northwest, Christopher performed in Broadway tours across the country, Off-Broadway, and in many of New York's premier clubs and cabarets.

Christopher was diagnosed with HIV in 1982, after he had started inexplicably bruising and bleeding while on the road in The Best Little Whorehouse in Texas, where he played a dancing football player. The doctors initially believed he had leukemia, but it turned out to be ITP – a platelet deficiency often associated with HIV. With Christopher's foremost love for music, he sang backup for his fellow singer/PWA, Michael Callen, who died of AIDS related complications in 1993.

By 1995, Christopher was extremely ill and made an agreement with God that if he got out of the hospital, he would devote his life to AIDS education and awareness. Christopher made television history in 1995 when he portrayed the first openly gay, HIV-positive character, Bruce, on network television on NBC's soap opera Another World. The news of an openly HIV positive character being portrayed by an openly HIV positive actor led to Christopher appearing on various talk shows, such as The Sally Jesse Raphael Show, as well as public-speaking engagements at colleges.

In the period spanning from late 1995 to 1996, Christopher moved on to appearing in the CBS daytime drama The Guiding Light. He played another HIV positive, gay character, Wyatt Sanders – a HIV counselor who supported a series-regular through her testing and diagnosis. This recurring role furthered Christopher's profile as it led to an NBC News profile by Tom Brokaw, and interview segments on Entertainment Tonight, CBS News at Noon, the Charles Perez Show, the PBS show In the Life and further appearances on several network television talk shows, radio shows and in publications across the country, including Out Magazine. He also appeared on an episode of Fox's TV Nation as one of a group of singers serenading senator Jesse Helms with the song "What the World Needs Now is Love."

During the last years of his life, he was a spokesperson for Gay Men's Health Crisis. At GMHC's 1997 AIDS Walk in Central Park, Christopher was a keynote speaker, along with Susan Sarandon, Tim Robbins, and Rosie Perez. He spoke of his long struggle with AIDS and his body's inability to benefit from the newest drug treatments. With this reality, he wrote an article for The Volunteer on the inefficacy of protease inhibitors for his condition, titled "New hope ... but not for me: Feel poisoned by Protease? Don't feel alone".

Around 1997, Christopher served as the spokesperson for a pharmaceutical company in a series of national radio spots. The year before he had switched his medication from saquinavir to ritonavir to Crixivan, before near-fatal side effects convinced him to cease all antiretrovirals. He revealed in POZ Magazine in 1998: "I was so dizzy and anesthetized that I asked myself, 'At what price survival?' I would much rather have a reasonable quality of life – working on my CD, making love with my boyfriend, and having a social life – than walk around like a zombie with an acceptable viral load."

From the mid-1990s Christopher had been working on a music album. In 1994 he was honored by Billboard Magazine with a Certificate of Achievement award for his song "Smiling in the Dark". As an environmentalist, another song of his, "One People" was commissioned by the United Nations Environmental Project, and "Pieces of Lives" was written for and performed by Christopher at the first display of the Names Project Memorial Quilt in New York City.

Christopher died of AIDS in New York at the age of 40 on 23 February 1998. At the time of his death, Christopher's debut album Naked Truth was near completion. The instrumental and backup tracks of some songs on this release were completed after his death and the album was then posthumously released by Significant Other Records later that year.

== Filmography ==
- Another World (NBC) – 1995
- Guiding Light (CBS) – 1995–1996

== Discography ==
=== Albums ===
- 1998: Naked Truth
