= Elt Drenth =

Dutch swimmer

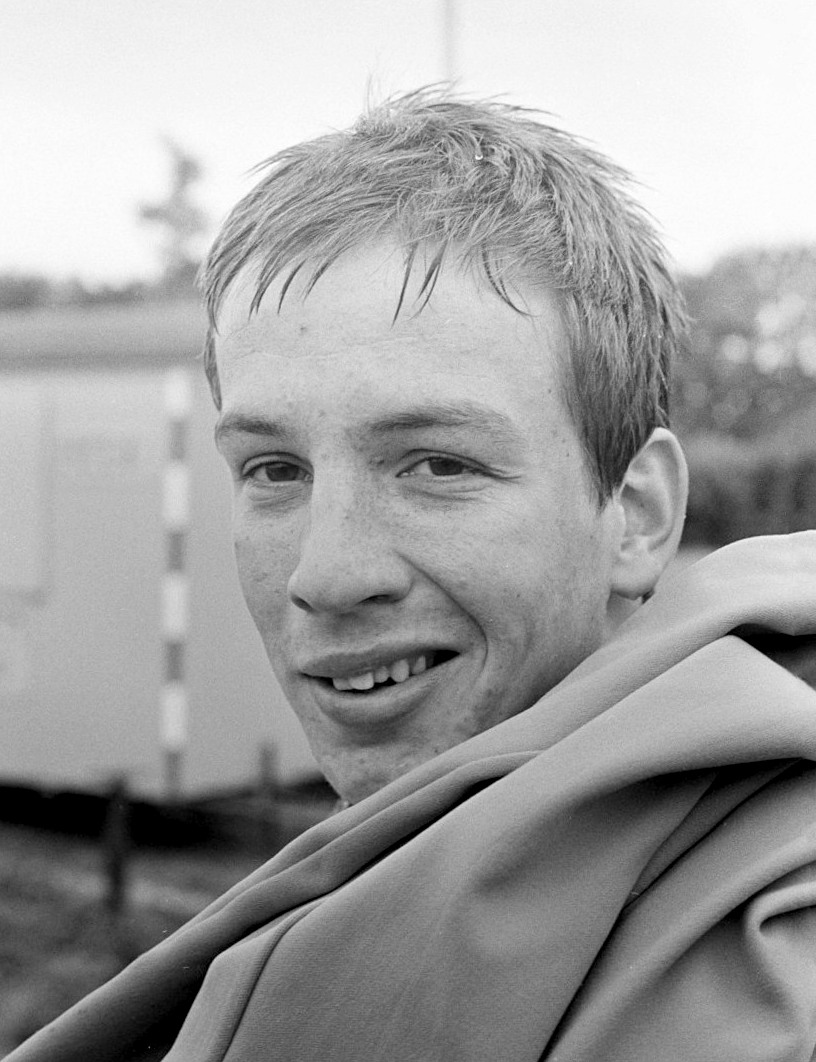
- Elt Drenth in 1968

Personal information
- Born: 29 May 1949 Dordrecht, Netherlands
- Died: 3 February 1998 (aged 48) Kudelstaart, Netherlands
- Height: 1.95 m (6 ft 5 in)
- Weight: 85 kg (187 lb)

Sport
- Sport: Swimming
- Club: Zwemlust, Utrecht

Eltje "Elt" Drenth (29 May 1949 – 3 February 1998) was a Dutch swimmer. He competed at the 1968 Summer Olympics in the 200 m and 4 × 200 m freestyle events, but failed to reach the finals.
