= 1998 Sudanese Air Force Antonov An-32 crash =

1998 aviation accident in South Sudan

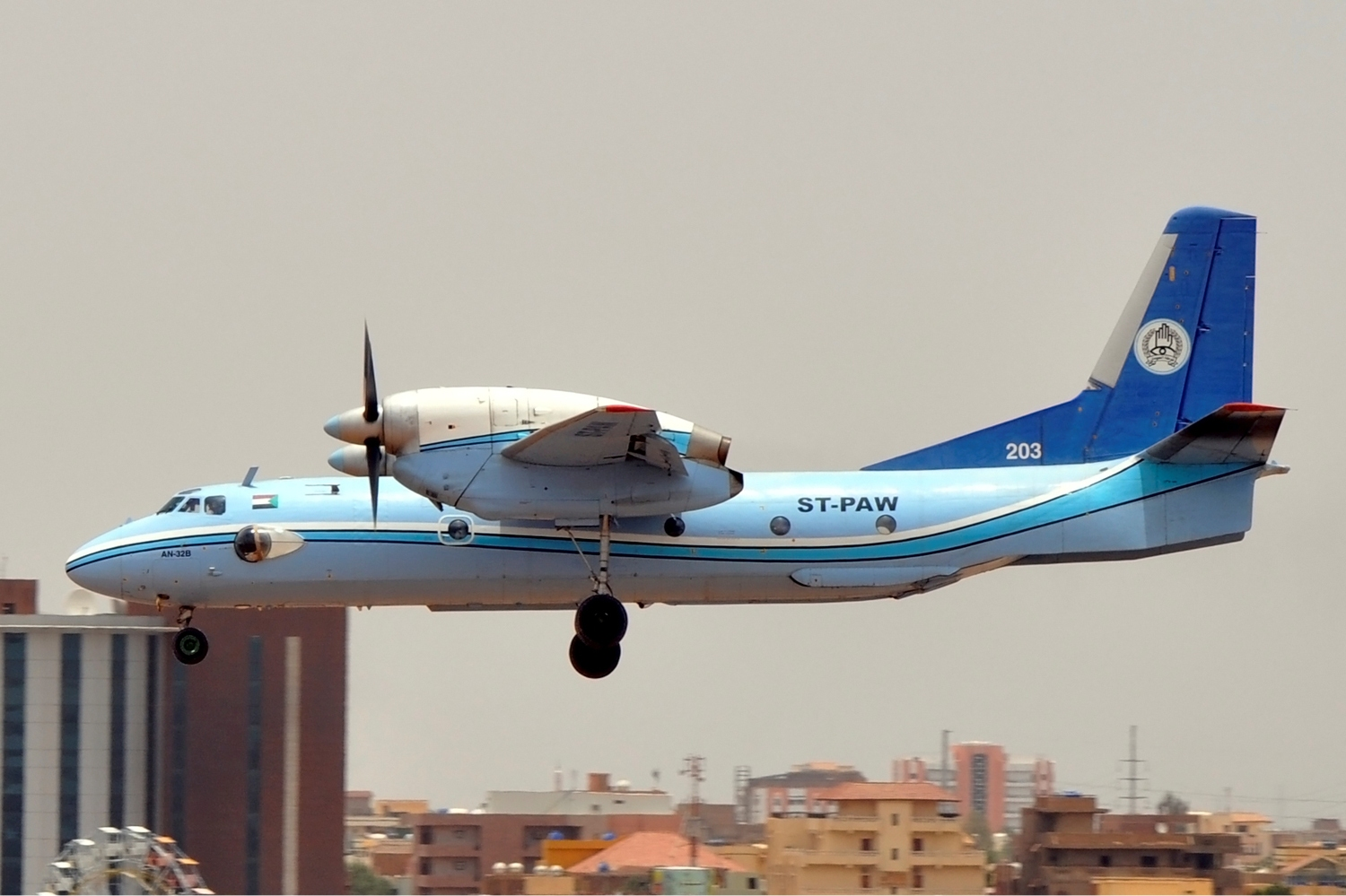
- An Antonov An-32 similar to the aircraft involved

Accident
- Date: 12 February 1998
- Summary: Runway overshoot in inclement weather
- Site: Nasir, South Sudan; 8.61616°N 33.06766°E

Aircraft
- Aircraft type: Antonov An-32
- Operator: Sudanese Air Force
- Registration: 7744
- Flight origin: Malakal Airport, South Sudan
- Destination: Nasir Airport, South Sudan
- Occupants: 57
- Passengers: 50
- Crew: 7
- Fatalities: 26
- Survivors: 31

On 12 February 1998, a Sudanese Air Force Antonov An-32 crashed in Nasir killing several of the country's most senior government leaders, including the Vice-President Zubair Mohamed Salih.

On the morning of 12 February 1998, the pilots of a Sudanese Air Force Antonov An-32 turboprop attempted to land at Nasir Airport. The craft overshot the end of the runway and slid into the Sobat River. The Sudanese government announced that fog and strong winds had caused the crash. The SPLA's spokesman in Nairobi announced that the crash had not been an accident, but had been caused by an SPLA attack.

== Casualties ==
Of the 57 crew and passengers on board, 26 drowned in the river. Among the dead were:

- Salih, the vice-president
- Musa Sayed Ahmed, Director General of the Supreme Council for Peace
- Arok Thon Arok, an ex-rebel turned government army officer
- Timothy Tutlam, director of the Relief Association of Southern Sudan

Information Minister Brigadier Mohamad Kheir and another minister survived.
