= Christopher Grose-Hodge =

British fencer

Personal information
- Born: 6 March 1924 Godalming, Surrey, England
- Died: 14 February 1998 (aged 73) Sutton, London, England

Sport
- Sport: Fencing

Christopher Grose-Hodge (6 March 1924 – 14 February 1998) was a British fencer. He competed in the team épée at the 1952 Summer Olympics.
