= Fernando Jardón =

Spanish field hockey player (1916–1998)

Personal information
- Full name: Fernando Jardón y Ron
- Nationality: Spanish
- Born: 16 August 1916 El Franco, Spain
- Died: 19 February 1998 (aged 81) Cuaña, Spain

Sport
- Sport: Field hockey

Fernando Jardón y Ron (16 August 1916 – 19 February 1998) was a Spanish field hockey player. He competed in the men's tournament at the 1948 Summer Olympics. Jardón died in Cuaña on 19 February 1998, at the age of 81.
