= Lulof Heetjans =

Dutch footballer

Personal information
- Full name: Lulof Anthon Heetjans
- Date of birth: 27 March 1916
- Place of birth: Zwolle, Netherlands
- Date of death: 4 February 1998 (aged 81)
- Place of death: Hengelo, Netherlands
- Position: Striker

Senior career*
Years	Team	Apps	(Gls)
1931–1937	PEC		
1937–1948	HVV Tubantia		

International career
1937	Netherlands	1	(0)
- * Club domestic league appearances and goals

Lulof Heetjans (27 March 1916 – 4 February 1998) was a Dutch footballer. He played in one match for the Netherlands national football team in 1937.

Born in Zwolle and nicknamed Junne, Heetjans played for local side PEC in the 1930s and became the club's first ever international player. He moved to Hengelo for work and joined local side HV Tubantia.
