= Menachem Shmuel David Raichik =

Orthodox rabbi (1918-1998)

Rabbi Menachem Shmuel David Raichik
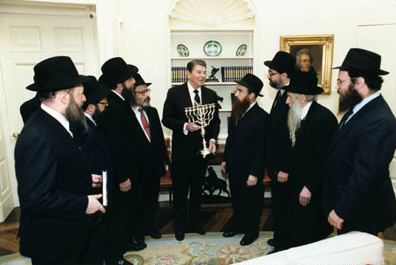
- Rabbi Menachem Shmuel David Raichik (second on right), with a delegation representing the "American Friends of Lubavitch", presenting a menorah to president Ronald Reagan, White House, 1984.
- Born: March 15, 1918
- Died: February 4, 1998 (aged 79)

Rabbi Menachem Shmuel David Raichik (March 15, 1918 – February 4, 1998) was an Orthodox rabbi of the Chabad-Lubavitch Hasidic movement, and the pioneer of Chabad's activities in Los Angeles, California. Raichik served as a shaliach for the sixth and seventh Lubavitcher Rebbes.

== Early life and education ==
He was born in the Polish town of Mlava. In 1936, upon the advice of the famous Amshinover Rebbe, the young Raichik enrolled in the Yeshiva Tomchei Temimim in Otwock, Poland, where he learned the Chabad doctrines of synthesis, scholarship, and personal refinement.

Fellow students recall his meticulous observance of the mitzvot and his passionate way of prayer. His Shabbat morning prayer ritual would last as long as six hours, and included lengthy meditations in the Chabad tradition. At night, when reciting the bedtime prayers, Raichik would often become engrossed in introspection into the wee hours, when the time came for morning prayers. During the day he employed his sharp mind in deep Talmudic study.

It was in the Lubavitch yeshiva that the young Raichik became attached to the sixth Lubavitcher Rebbe, Rabbi Yosef Yitzchok Schneersohn. In a short time he became one of the select group who memorized and reviewed the Rebbe's discourses, known as choizrim.

== During World War II ==
With the outbreak of World War II at the end of 1939, Raichik and his fellow yeshiva students were forced to flee Otwock. Shortly before Chanukah that year, Raichik and a friend reached Warsaw, Poland, where the Rebbe guided them and gave them money to escape to Vilnius, Lithuania.

Once he reached Lithuania, Raichik labored tirelessly to save fellow students from German-occupied Poland and the Baltic states. Despite his own capture once by border police, he organized smuggling operations, bringing many refugees across the border to safer territory.

When Japan's consul to Lithuania, Chiune Sugihara, sacrificed his diplomatic career to issue Japanese passports to Jewish refugees, Raichik helped procure visas for his fellow students and others. After spending close to a year in Kobe, Japan, the yeshiva relocated again, this time to Shanghai, China, where many other Jews spent the remainder of the war years as well. In Shanghai, Rabbi Raichik became the foundation for the uprooted Lubavitch yeshiva. In addition to overseeing the daily running of the school, friends recall how lovingly he served as surrogate parent to the younger students. Though given many chances to leave, Raichik chose to stay in until the very last student was able to leave, in 1946.

Throughout that period Raichik was in communication with the Rebbe who, in addition to massive fund-raising and rescue efforts for Jews in German-occupied territory and Russia, raised money to send to Shanghai.

== American years ==
When Raichik finally reached the United States, the Rebbe immediately put him under the wing of his son-in-law and later successor, Rabbi Menachem Mendel Schneerson to travel by train across North America to seek out Jews, in groups and as individuals, to identify local communal needs and bolster Jewish identity.

For months on end, Raichik criss-crossed the United States, dining on sardines and fruits and vegetables, visiting Jews in places like Chattanooga, Tennessee and Cheyenne, Wyoming, setting up schools and Mikvahs, and generally mapping the way for a future Jewish revival.

Because of his obvious refinement and gentle disposition, people took an immediate liking to Raichik. Much of the post-war Jewish infrastructure in many cities across the United States can be traced to Raichik's tireless efforts.

After his marriage in 1948 to Lea Rappoport, herself a Holocaust survivor, Raichik and his new bride were dispatched to Los Angeles, California as personal emissaries of the sixth Rebbe.

Following the sixth Rebbe's passing in 1950, Raichik was among the Lubavitcher Chassidim who pleaded with the Rebbe's son-in-law, Rabbi Menachem M. Schneerson, to become the movement's new leader. The new Rebbe, whose suggestion it was that the Raichiks be sent to Los Angeles, wrote to Raichik that his position was not to be limited to one synagogue, but "his net should be spread on the entire city and its surrounding areas."

In addition to his work as the Chabad Shliach to Los Angeles, Raichik also continued his practice of traveling around the United States for a number of months each year to spread Judaism and pave the way for future Shluchim to that particular place. Another one of his functions as a traveling emissary of the Lubavitcher Rebbe was to collect money (known as maimed, Hebrew: מעמד), which were personal funds for the Rebbe's private usage. These funds are a non-specified amount of money traditionally given each year by Chassidim.

In the spring of 1967 (two days before the outbreak of the Six-Day War on June 3, 1967), the Rebbe issued a directive to start Mivtza Tefillin, an international campaign by Chabad Hasidim to influence all male Jews, regardless of their level of religious observance, to fulfill the Mitzvah of Tefillin (phylacteries) daily. Raichik became actively involved in this, making his rounds every day in the Fairfax area of Los Angeles where he lived, and finding Jewish men who hadn't yet put on Tefillin that day. He always carried tefillin, and was known for helping people put them on anywhere and everywhere, including airplanes, airports, trains, the White House, shopping malls, etc. He continued this practice until hospitalized by a stroke in December, 1997.

In 1990, Raichik was appointed to the executive boards of Merkos L'Inyonei Chinuch, (educational arm of the Lubavitch movement), Mahane Israel (the social service arm), and Agudas Chasidei Chabad, the umbrella organization that oversees the worldwide network of Chabad-Lubavitch organizations and institutions.

Toward the end of his life Raichik suffered greatly from the debilitating Parkinson's disease, but refused to allow it to hamper his busy schedule.

He died on February 4, 1998. His funerals in Los Angeles and New York were attended by thousands of people. In New York, the funeral procession filed past 770 Eastern Parkway and continued to the Old Montefiore Cemetery in Queens, where he was interred close to the resting place of the two Lubavitcher Rebbes he had so faithfully served.

He is survived by his ten children and their families, many of whom serve as shluchim and leaders in their respective communities around the globe. His wife Leah died in August 2007.
