= Elbert Eatmon =

Professional baseball player

- Pitcher
- Born: August 3, 1914; Tuscaloosa, Alabama, U.S.
- Died: February 9, 1998 (aged 83); Birmingham, Alabama, U.S.
- Batted: Unknown Threw: Left

Negro league baseball debut
- 1937, for the Birmingham Black Barons

Last appearance
- 1939, for the Memphis Red Sox
- Stats at Baseball Reference

Teams
- Birmingham Black Barons (1937-1938); Memphis Red Sox (1939)

Elbert "Lefty" Eatmon (August 3, 1914 – February 9, 1998) was an American professional baseball pitcher in the Negro leagues. He played with the Birmingham Black Barons in 1937 and 1938 and the Memphis Red Sox in 1939.

The Quad-City Times called Eatmon the "foremost southpaw" in the Negro American League in 1938.
