= Rocke Robertson =

Canadian physician (1912–1998)

- Born: Harold Rocke Robertson; August 4, 1912; Victoria, British Columbia
- Died: February 8, 1998 (aged 85); Ottawa, Ontario
- Other names: H. Rocke Robertson, Rocke
- Occupations: Surgeon, academic
- Known for: Principal and Vice-Chancellor of McGill University

Harold Rocke Robertson CC FRSC (August 4, 1912 – February 8, 1998), was a Canadian physician and the former Principal and Vice-Chancellor of McGill University (1962–1970).

== Biography ==
Rocke Robertson was born in Victoria, British Columbia in 1912. He studied in Switzerland before moving to Montreal in 1929 to attend McGill University, where he received his B.S. in 1932 and M.D. in 1936.

He married Beatrice "Rolly" Rosalyn Arnold in 1937, and the couple would go on to have four children: Tam, Ian, Bea and Stuart.

Following an internship at Montreal General Hospital and fellowship at the Royal Infirmary of Edinburgh, Robertson enlisted with the Royal Canadian Army Medical Corps. He served in World War II, first in England, where he commanded surgical units in the field, and then as part of the Allied invasion of Sicily, achieving the rank of lieutenant colonel. Robertson returned to British Columbia when he was put in charge of surgery at the Vancouver Military Hospital and Shaughnessy Veteran's Hospital in 1944.

After the war, in 1950, he became the first Professor and Chair of the Department of Surgery at the University of British Columbia, where he played a major role in the founding of their medical school.

In 1959, Robertson became Surgeon-in-Chief at Montreal General Hospital, where he oversaw the creation of the University Surgical Clinic, developed a Surgical Intensive Care Unit and was named Chairman of Surgery. Robertson invented the trauma team while working at the hospital, and remained there until being appointed Principal of McGill in 1962. He was the first physician and the first McGill University graduate to serve as its Principal and Vice Chancellor. During his time as Principal, the university was undergoing rapid expansion, both in physical size and in the numbers of staff and students. However, Quebec in the 1960s saw a resurgence of conflicts surrounding Quebec nationalism, and the university saw student demonstrations and protests throughout Robertson's leadership. In response, Robertson introduced an important policy that permitted students to submit papers and exams in French.

He received honorary degrees from many universities: Bishop's University, University of Manitoba, University of Toronto, University of Victoria (1964), University of Glasgow, University of British Columbia (1964), Université de Montréal, University of Michigan, Dartmouth College, Harvard University, Memorial University (1968) and Sir George Williams University (1971), which later became Concordia University.

He was elected a Fellow of the Royal Society of Canada in 1968 and was made a Companion of the Order of Canada in 1969. He was also a fellow of the Royal College of Physicians and Surgeons of Canada, the American College of Surgeons and the Royal College of Surgeons. In 1969, shortly before he retired as McGill's principal, he was made a Companion of the Order of Canada. A prolific writer, Robertson also had a passion for lexicography and for collecting rare English dictionaries. When he died in his 86th year, he left behind his beloved wife Rolly and their four children. His archive is held at the McGill University Archives.
