= Giorgio Cattaneo =

Italian speed skater

Personal information
- Full name: Giorgio Arnaldo Cattaneo
- Nationality: Italian
- Born: 21 February 1923 Limbiate, Kingdom of Italy
- Died: 17 February 1998 (aged 74) Sanremo, Italy

Sport
- Sport: Speed skating

Giorgio Cattaneo (21 February 1923 – 17 February 1998) was an Italian speed skater. He competed in two events at the 1948 Winter Olympics.
