= Gabriel Laub =

Polish-born German journalist and political satirist

Gabriel Laub (24 October 1928 in Bochnia, Poland – 3 February 1998 in Hamburg, Germany) was a Czech- and German-speaking journalist, political satirist and aphorism writer.

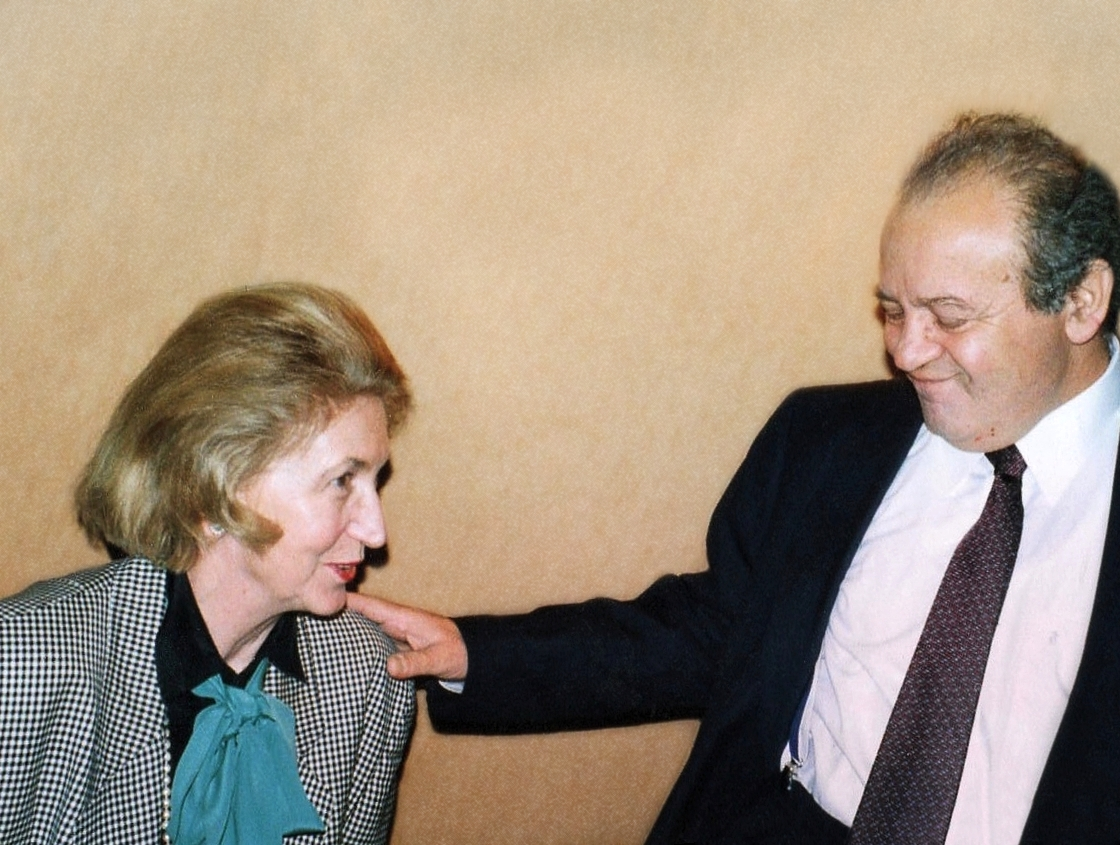
Gabriel Laub with Rosemarie Fiedler-Winter

== Personal life ==
Laub grew up in Kraków. Due to his Jewish heritage, he fled with his parents during the invasion of Poland in 1939. They fled to the Soviet Union but were interned for sixteen months in what is now Uzbekistan. After World War II, he moved to Prague where he studied journalism and worked as an editor and writer until 1968. Following the defeat of the Prague Spring reforms, he fled to Hamburg. There he published his collections of aphorisms in German.

He received numerous awards including the 1971 short story prize given by the city of Arnsberg and the 1991 Irmgard-Heilmann Prize.
Laub was buried in Israel.

== Works ==
- Angry Logic (1969)
- Allowed to Think (1972)
- Double-barreled Attack (1977, English edition)
- The Right to be Right (1982)
- The Rise of Thickness (1983)

== Quotes ==
- "In a totalitarian regime, idiots gain power through violence and intrigue; in a democracy, through free elections."
- "Political parties with strong wings develop weak legs."
- "Men appreciate aphorisms because among other reasons, they contain half-truths. That is an unusually high percentage."
- "The future of literature is with the aphorism. It can't be made into a movie. [Die Zukunft der Literatur liegt im Aphorismus. Den kann man nicht verfilmen.]" —Gabriel Laub, Denken erlaubt: Aphorismen (Giitersloh: Mohn, n.d.), 8.
- "The computer has the advantage over the brain that it is used,"
