= Malakal =

- City
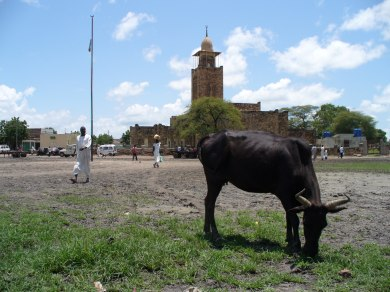
- Malakal in August 2005

- Location in South Sudan
- Coordinates: 09°33′00″N 31°39′00″E
- Country: South Sudan
- Region: Greater Upper Nile
- State: Upper Nile State
- County: Malakal County
- Payam: Central Malakal and Southern Malakal
- Elevation: 385 m (1,263 ft)

Population (2014 est)
  - Total: 147,450
- Time zone: UTC+2 (CAT)

Malakal is a city in South Sudan, serving as the capital of Upper Nile State in the Greater Upper Nile region of South Sudan, along the White Nile River. It also serves as the headquarters of Malakal County, and it served as the headquarters of Upper Nile Region from the 1970s to the late 1990s.

== Geography ==
The city of Malakal is located along the White Nile, in upper Nile state, South Sudan, close to the International borders with the Republic of Sudan and with Ethiopia. The town is located on the banks of the White Nile, just north of its confluence with the Sobat River.

This location lies approximately 650 kilometres (400 mi), by road, directly north of Juba, the capital and largest city of South Sudan.

== History ==
Historically, Malakal was founded by the Kuei family and known as the former Sobat District. The town of Malakal started as a tiny District administrative unit which later expanded into a big town, becoming the capital city of the Upper Nile State (since 2020). It was also the capital of the defunct Eastern Nile State and Central Upper Nile State. During the Second Sudanese Civil War, the town was a garrison town of the Khartoum-based Sudanese Armed Forces (SAF). Following South Sudan's independence on 9 July 2011, the troops from the Republic of Sudan retreated from Malakal. Malakal was the site of the November 2006 Battle of Malakal.

The level of destruction suffered by the town was described by Bishop Stephen Nyodho, in a 2026 interview in which he recalled what he found when he returned to the city in 2019. "When I went back, there was nothing, not even a chair or table, nothing. I had to start from zero. Many churches, many chapels, including all the other institutions of the Church had been destroyed, nothing remained. When I first saw it, I cried, because this was the town where I was born, where I grew up. But my house, my school, everything was gone". He then describes his efforts at rebuilding the Church in Malakal, and attributes his decision to remain in the city, despite the destruction, as a factor in its revival. "The fact I stayed in Malakal brought hope. Now there are more than 20,000 people. Almost all the schools are open, and they are full of children. Life is coming back!"

Beginning in 2013, Malakal was the site of numerous battles between government SPLA forces and the Nuer White Army, loosely commanded by the SPLM-IO headed by Riek Machar. The city was overrun on various occasions by both sides. As of October 2015, Malakal had exchanged hands twelve times during the civil war, and was utterly destroyed in the process.

On 14 October 2016, an assault occurred on many government positions in Malakal, leaving 56 Agwelek assailants killed.

On 8 June 2023, clashes broke out at Malakal in a UNMISS-run refugee camp between two different groups of civilians. At least 13 civilians were killed, and 20 more were injured in the clashes.

== Education ==
The Upper Nile University was founded in 1991.

Other schools in the area include St. Iwanga Catholic School and Malakia Primary School.

== Places of worship ==
Among the places of worship, they are predominantly Christian churches and temples : Roman Catholic Diocese of Malakal (Catholic Church), Province of the Episcopal Church of South Sudan (Anglican Communion), Baptist Convention of South Sudan (Baptist World Alliance), Presbyterian Church in Sudan (World Communion of Reformed Churches). There are also Muslim mosques.

== Climate ==
Like other parts of the Sahel, Malakal has a hot semi-arid climate (Köppen climate classification BSh), with a wet season and a dry season and the temperature being hot year-round. The average annual mean temperature is 28.1 °C (82.6 °F), the average annual high temperature is 34.7 °C (94.5 °F), while the average annual low temperature is 21.5 °C (70.7 °F). The hottest time of year is from February to May (Northern Hemisphere spring), just before the wet season starts. April is the hottest month, having the highest average high at 38.8 °C (101.8 °F) and the highest mean at 31.5 °C (88.7 °F). April also has the highest average low at 24.2 °C (75.6 °F). August has the lowest average high at 30.9 °C (87.6 °F) and the lowest mean at 26.3 °C (79.3 °F). January has the lowest average low at 18.5 °C (65.3 °F). On average, July and August are coldest months, which makes summer the coldest season.

Malakal receives 731.6 millimetres (28.80 in) of rain over 68.0 precipitation days, with a distinct wet and dry season like all of South Sudan. December and January receive no precipitation at all, and almost no rain falls from November to March. August, the wettest month, receives 163.4 millimetres (6.43 in) of rainfall on average. August also has 14.9 precipitation days, which is the most of any month. Humidity is much higher in the wet season than the dry season, with February having a humidity at just 25% and August having a humidity at 80%. Malakal receives 2778.7 hours of sunshine annually on average, with the sunshine being distributed fairly evenly across the year, although it is lower during the wet season. December receives the most sunshine, while July receives the least.

Climate data for Malakal
Month	Jan	Feb	Mar	Apr	May	Jun	Jul	Aug	Sep	Oct	Nov	Dec	Year
Record high °C (°F)	41.7 (107.1)	43.0 (109.4)	44.4 (111.9)	43.7 (110.7)	42.5 (108.5)	39.5 (103.1)	38.0 (100.4)	36.7 (98.1)	37.8 (100.0)	39.5 (103.1)	40.0 (104.0)	40.5 (104.9)	44.4 (111.9)
Mean daily maximum °C (°F)	34.9 (94.8)	36.8 (98.2)	38.7 (101.7)	38.8 (101.8)	35.9 (96.6)	33.1 (91.6)	31.1 (88.0)	30.9 (87.6)	31.9 (89.4)	33.6 (92.5)	35.1 (95.2)	35.0 (95.0)	34.7 (94.5)
Daily mean °C (°F)	26.7 (80.1)	28.5 (83.3)	30.9 (87.6)	31.5 (88.7)	29.8 (85.6)	27.7 (81.9)	26.5 (79.7)	26.3 (79.3)	26.9 (80.4)	27.7 (81.9)	27.5 (81.5)	26.8 (80.2)	28.1 (82.6)
Mean daily minimum °C (°F)	18.5 (65.3)	20.1 (68.2)	23.0 (73.4)	24.2 (75.6)	23.7 (74.7)	22.4 (72.3)	21.8 (71.2)	21.7 (71.1)	21.9 (71.4)	21.9 (71.4)	19.9 (67.8)	18.6 (65.5)	21.5 (70.7)
Record low °C (°F)	11.4 (52.5)	10.0 (50.0)	16.4 (61.5)	16.5 (61.7)	17.5 (63.5)	17.6 (63.7)	17.0 (62.6)	17.0 (62.6)	18.0 (64.4)	15.0 (59.0)	14.0 (57.2)	12.2 (54.0)	10.0 (50.0)
Average precipitation mm (inches)	0.0 (0.0)	0.2 (0.01)	6.9 (0.27)	19.9 (0.78)	86.1 (3.39)	103.4 (4.07)	146.8 (5.78)	163.4 (6.43)	124.4 (4.90)	75.6 (2.98)	4.9 (0.19)	0.0 (0.0)	731.6 (28.80)
Average precipitation days (≥ 0.1 mm)	0.0	0.1	1.0	2.1	7.0	10.0	13.9	14.9	10.9	7.3	0.8	0.0	68.0
Average relative humidity (%)	30	25	29	40	59	70	78	80	78	72	49	35	54
Mean monthly sunshine hours	294.5	263.2	260.4	261.0	229.4	168.0	151.9	170.5	177.0	223.2	282.0	297.6	2,778.7
Mean daily sunshine hours	9.5	9.4	8.4	8.7	7.4	5.6	4.9	5.5	5.9	7.2	9.4	9.6	7.6
Percentage possible sunshine	82	80	70	70	58	43	39	43	48	61	81	85	63
Source: NOAA

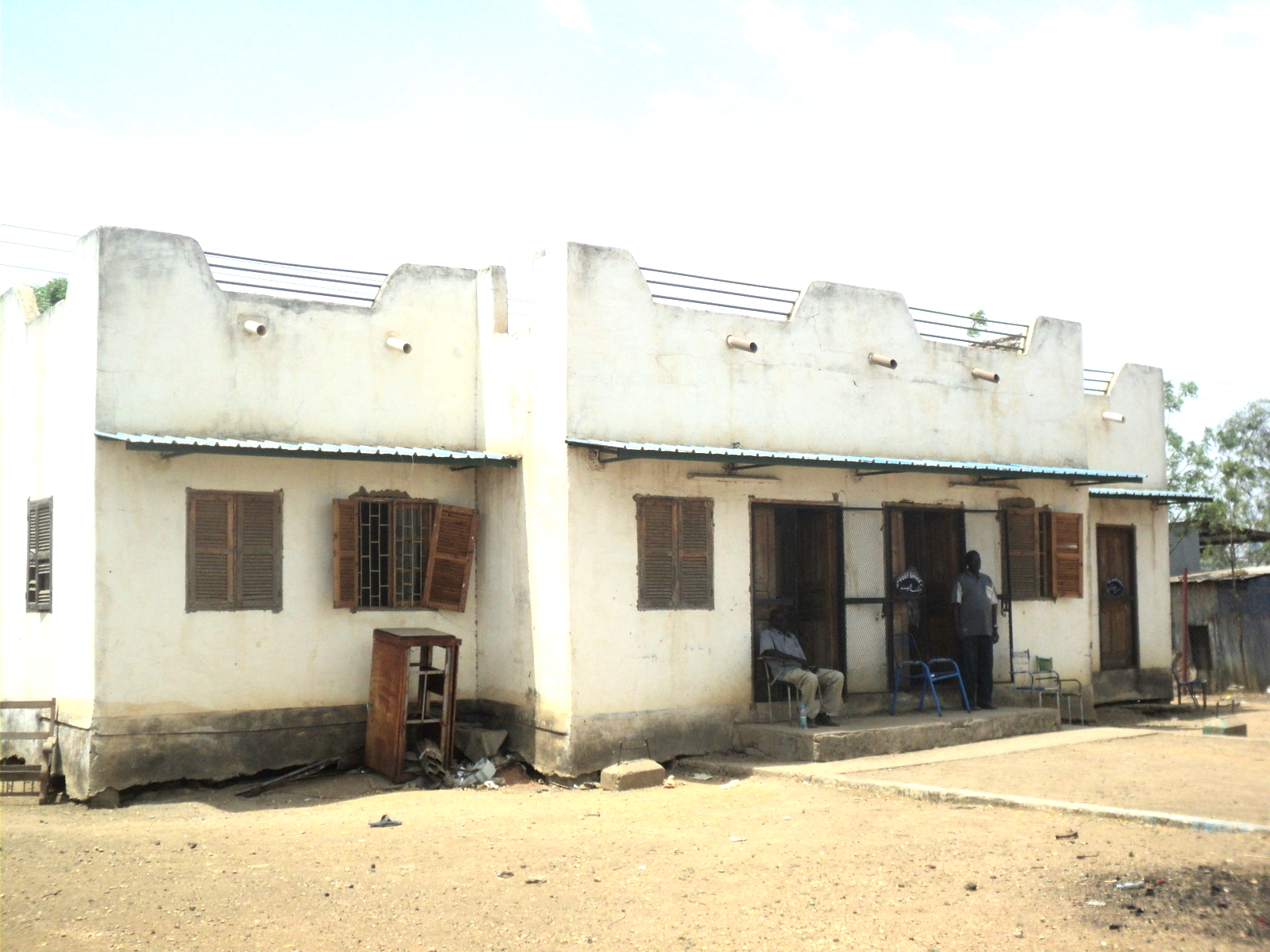
Post office of Malakal, South Sudan in 2011

== Transportation ==
A major road linking Malakal with the town of Kurmuk at the border with Ethiopia is under repairs and renovations to asphalt surface. The road is expected to be ready for commissioning by May 2013. The city of Malakal is also served by Malakal International Airport, one of the two International airports in South Sudan, the other being Juba International Airport. Water traffic on the White Nile River can travel as far north as Khartoum in the Republic of Sudan, and as far south as Adok in Lakes State.

== Newspapers ==
Malakal has very limited newspapers circulated in hardcopy form. However, the Juba-based 'Citizen' is widely read around the town. In the eve of Independence day on 9 July 2011, The Upper Nile Times online newspaper was launched. The website for this online digital newspaper is no longer active.

== Population ==
As of 2005 the population of Malakal was estimated at 129,620. The 2008 Sudanese census, which was boycotted by the South Sudanese government, recorded a population of about 126,500. However, those results are disputed by the authorities in Juba. In 2010, it was estimated that the population of Malakal had grown to about 139,450. Below is a table depicting the estimated population of the city from 1983 until 2010 from all sources:

Year	Population
1983	33,750
1993	72,000
2005	129,620
2008	126,500
2010	139,450

== Notable people ==
- Abuk Payiti Ayik, has represented Malakal in the Southern Sudan Legislative Assembly and the National Legislative Assembly
- Aguil Chut-Deng, revolutionary and activist
- Nahid Gabrallah, human rights activist
- Sayed Abdel Gadir, boxer

== Gallery ==
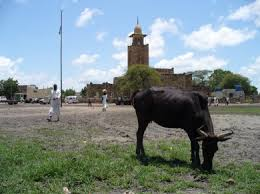
Malakal town

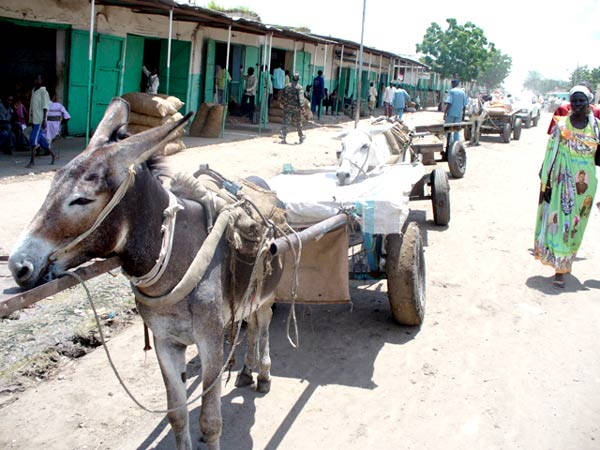
Malakal center

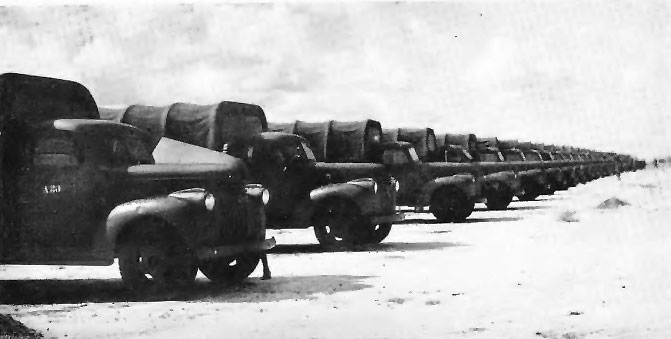
Trucks of the Force Publique (Belgian-Congolese colonial army) parked at Malakal during World War II

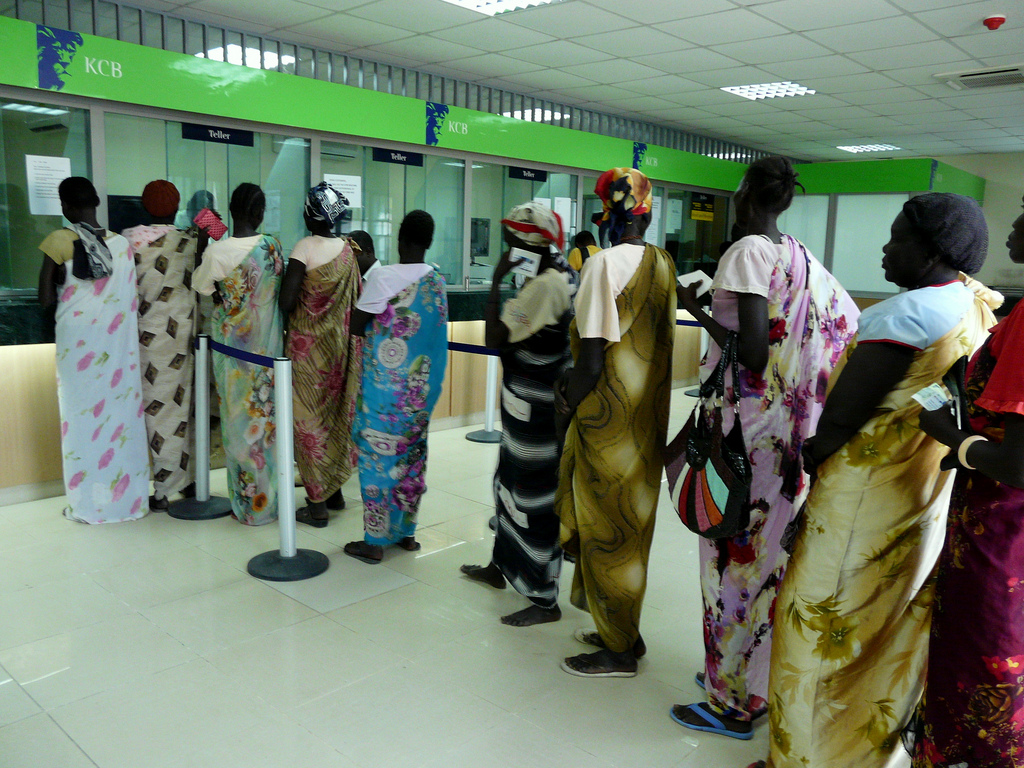
Kenya Commercial Bank in Malakal town

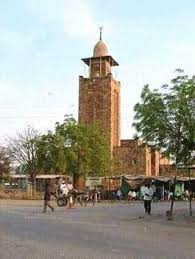
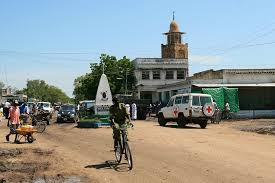

== See also ==
- Malakal Teaching Hospital
- Greater Upper Nile
- List of cities in South Sudan
