= Ramchandran Jaikumar =

- Born: December 17, 1944; Madras, India
- Died: February 10, 1998 (aged 53); Quito, Ecuador
- Education: Indian Institute of Technology Madras; Oklahoma State University; Wharton School of the University of Pennsylvania
- Occupation: Academic
- Employer: Harvard Business School
- Spouse: Mrinalini Mani
- Children: 2 sons

Ramchandran Jaikumar, also known as Jai Jaikumar, (December 17, 1944 – February 10, 1998) was an Indian-born, US-based decision scientist. He was the Daewoo Professor of Business Administration at the Harvard Business School. He was an expert in computer-aided manufacturing, robots and operating systems. He won several awards for his research.

== Early life ==
Ramchandran Jaikumar was born on December 17, 1944, in Madras, now known as Chennai, India.

Jaikumar graduated from the Indian Institute of Technology Madras, where he earned a bachelor's degree. While he was in college, he took up rock climbing. He subsequently earned a master's degree in industrial engineering from Oklahoma State University and a PhD in decision sciences from the Wharton School of the University of Pennsylvania, where his thesis supervisor was Professor Marshall L. Fisher.

== Career ==
Jaikumar began his career at the Harvard Business School in 1980, where he taught MBA students. He subsequently became the Daewoo Professor of Business Administration. He was an expert in computer-aided manufacturing. In a 1984 article, he compared robots made in the United States and Japan, and he concluded that Japanese robots were far superior. By the 1990s, he published research about operating systems, and he argued for a minimalist approach.

Jaikumar worked with his thesis advisor Fisher on a consulting project between the University of Pennsylvania and Air Products & Chemicals, which won the 1983 Franz Edelman Award for Achievement in Operations Research and the Management Sciences. He won the same award in 1998. He also won the E. Grosvener Best Paper Award from the Council of Supply Chain Management Professionals in 1984. Additionally, he won the Frederick Winslow Taylor Medal from the American Society of Mechanical Engineers and the Grosvenor Plowman Prize from the National Council for Physical Distribution Management.

Jaikumar served on committees of the National Research Council. He was an advisor to the Office of Technology Assessment and the United States Senate Committee on Commerce and Science.

Jaikumar encouraged his students to enjoy their lives outside the classroom. He also taught that success was ultimately a matter of luck, which meant successful professionals were duty-bound to give back and help the less fortunate.

== Personal life and death ==
Jaikumar was married to Mrinalini Mani, and they had two sons, Nikhil and Arjun. They resided in West Newton, Massachusetts. Jaikumar climbed the Himalayas. On another trip to Greenland, he climbed a previously nameless mountain and called it "Minarjnik."

As an adult, Jaikumar built a school and paid for the teaching staff of a Himalayan village where he had been rescued from a fall by an Indian shepherdess during a climbing expedition when he was a college student.

Jaikumar died of a heart attack while he was rock-climbing in Quito, Ecuador on February 10, 1998. He was 53. A memorial service was held at the Memorial Church of Harvard University.
