= Manuel Delgado Villegas =

Spanish serial killer

- Mugshot taken upon his arrest on 18 January 1971
- Born: Manuel Delgado Villegas; 25 January 1943; Seville, Andalusia, Spain
- Died: 2 February 1998 (aged 55); Badalona, Catalonia, Spain
- Other names: El Arropiero; El Estrangulador del Puerto
- Children: Mary Victoria Penso
- Conviction: Life Sentence
- Penalty: Interned in a mental institution for life

Details
- Victims: 7 confirmed, 48 claimed
- Span of crimes: 1964–1971
- Country: France, Italy, Spain
- Date apprehended: 18 January 1971

Manuel Delgado Villegas (Spanish pronunciation: [manw'el delˈɣaðo βiˈʎeɣas]; 25 January 1943 – 2 February 1998), also known as El Arropiero,^{[a]} was a Spanish serial killer active between 1964 and 1971. Delgado claimed to have carried out 48 murders in Spain, Italy and France – of these cases the Spanish police were only able to investigate twenty-two in Spain and considered him the definite perpetrator of seven. He was never brought to trial, as he was diagnosed with a severe mental disorder. In 1978 the Audiencia Nacional ordered that he be preventively detained at Carabanchel Penitentiary Psychiatric Hospital. He was released into the care of a psychiatric hospital in 1996 and died two years later of a smoking-related lung disease.

== Biography ==
=== Early life ===
Manuel Delgado Villegas was born in Seville, Spain on 25 January 1943, the son of José Delgado Martín. His mother died while giving birth to him, at the age of 24. The itinerant nature of his father's job as a salesman of arrope (a fruit concentrate produced in southern Spain and used to make sweets), hence the nickname El Arropiero, resulted in Delgado and his sister Joaquina being sent to live with their maternal grandmother in Mataró. The two children lived with their grandmother in the predominantly Andalusian neighbourhood of La Cirera. He attended school but never learned to read and write. Delgado was bisexual and prostituted himself from early adolescence.

In 1961, aged 18, Delgado enlisted in the Spanish Legion. There he learnt hand-to-hand combat techniques, and one in particular, the golpe legionario or golpe mortal (literally "deadly blow"), a blow to the larynx with the edge of the hand that became one of his preferred methods of killing.

After the army, Delgado left Mataró and became a nomad, wandering along the Mediterranean coast begging, stealing and picking fights with prostitutes and homosexuals. He was arrested several times under the Ley de Vagos y Maleantes or Ley de Peligrosidad Social (translation - "Law of Vagrants and Crooks" and "Law of Social Danger") that targeted beggars and homosexuals in Francoist Spain, but was never imprisoned. His odd behaviour under arrest always led to his being sent to mental institutions, from which he was soon released.

== Murders ==
Delgado killed his first confirmed victim in 1964, aged 21, and remained active until his arrest at 28 in 1971. He never killed with premeditation. Sometimes a simple trivial comment by the victim would be taken as an insult and unleash Delgado's rage, who would kill them with great violence using a blunt object, strangling them or with his bare hands; Delgado would attack others with the intention of robbing them or, if the victim was female, raping them, which he did only after they were dead. The wildly different nature of the crimes and the victims (men and women, young and old, Spanish and foreign, heterosexual and homosexual, rich and poor) and Delgado's nomadic lifestyle made it impossible, before his confession, for law enforcement to connect the killings as the work of a single person. Only the last two murders happened in the same place and close in time, precipitating Delgado's arrest.

=== Victims ===
==== Confirmed by the investigation ====
Locations of the murders of the confirmed victims
- Adolfo Folch Muntaner (21 January 1964), 49 – A chef. He was killed while sleeping on the beach of Llorac in Garraf, near Barcelona. Folch had gone to the beach that day to take some sand, used at the time to clean the fat from kitchen pots and stoves.

"I saw a sleeping man leaning against a wall. I approached him and very slowly, with a large rock that I had picked up close to the wall, hit him over the head. When I realised that he was dead, I took his wallet and the watch on his wrist. He had barely anything in it and the watch was crap!"

— Manuel Delgado Villegas

- Margaret Hélène Thérese Boudrie (20 June 1967), 21 – A French student from Lyon. She was staying in a small house in Can Planas, a holiday resort five kilometres from Ibiza Town, along with a friend. Delgado sneaked into her room and suffocated her with a pillow. Once she was dead, he stabbed her in the back with a stiletto, raped her body and stole a medal that she was wearing around her neck. The body was found with multiple bruises and scratches. Her friend, an American tourist named Jules Morton, was arrested and held in prison for over a year before his innocence was proven.
- Venancio Hernández Carrasco (20 July 1968), 71 – Hernández was tending his vineyards by the banks of the Tajuña River in the town of Chinchón when Delgado approached him asking for food. Hernández replied that he was young and that if he wanted to eat he ought to work. This comment cost him his life. His body was found floating in the river near the San Galindo dam and was initially reported as an accidental drowning. Delgado later changed his testimony and claimed that he killed Hernández because he saw him trying to rape a little girl.
- Ramón Estrada Saldrich (5 April 1969) – A homosexual furniture dealer from Barcelona and regular client of Delgado, whose services he hired for 300 pesetas. According to Delgado, they were in his dealership when he asked Estrada to give him 1,000 pesetas (about $10) and he agreed to do so after sex, but he only paid Delgado the usual 300. Delgado hit Estrada in the neck, but he was only knocked out and began to insult Delgado after recovering his senses. Delgado then tore a leg off an armchair and bludgeoned Estrada with it, before finally strangling him until his neck broke.
- Anastasia Borrella Moreno (23 November 1969), 68 – Killed in Mataró. Delgado hit her on the head with a brick and pushed her off a bridge. He then dragged her into a tunnel and strangled her.
- Francisco Marín Ramírez (3 December 1970), 28 – An electrician employed by Renfe and a friend of Delgado's, perhaps a client. Delgado claimed that he had killed Marín by punching him twice in the head after he had made sexual advances towards him. His body was found by a fisherman on December 12, floating in the Guadalete river, underneath the San Alejandro bridge in El Puerto de Santa María, 12 kilometres from the place of the murder.
- Antonia Rodríguez Relinque (18 January 1971), 38 – Considered his girlfriend by Delgado, who introduced her as such to his father, and also killed in El Puerto de Santa María. Rodríguez was a promiscuous woman and was reputed to have a slight intellectual disability. While they were having sex behind some bushes, Rodríguez asked Delgado to do something that "disgusted" him and he refused. She then insulted him, saying that he wasn't a man because she had been with men who had done that to her when asked, and Delgado strangled her with her own leggings. Delgado hid the body and returned to have sex with it on three consecutive nights before he was arrested. When asked, Delgado said that he had sex with her because dead or alive she was still his girlfriend.

==== Possible ====
Delgado's confirmed crimes are often misreported as eight instead of seven. This probably stems from a 1977 article in the popular weekly newspaper El Caso, that proposed Delgado as the possible murderer of Natividad Romero Rodríguez, a prostitute found dead in a large clay jar in a country house near Barajas, Madrid in 1969. She had been raped and strangled with great violence by a man using only one hand three days before, leading the investigators to suspect someone with a military background, possibly an American pilot from the nearby Torrejón Air Base since the victim had often been seen in such company. The crime, however, remains unsolved and was never linked to Delgado by the police. Another victim often cited is Almudena Sánchez Rus, murdered in El Puerto de Santa María in 1972, but at that time Delgado was already arrested and in custody.

Delgado also claimed to have killed a foreign woman in Sant Feliu de Guixols, stabbed another woman in Alicante, strangled a homosexual man with a wire in Barcelona and even thrown another homosexual, a client, off a cliff in Garraf after the victim said "Such beauty! Such a view! I wouldn't mind dying right in this place!", to which Delgado replied "Die then" and pushed him. On another occasion, Delgado displayed discomfort upon hearing over the police car radio that 80 bodies had been found buried in a man's garden in Mexico; he immediately asked the police to be freed for 24 hours, promising not to escape, "so this guy doesn't beat me."

=== Criminal investigation and arrest ===
Following the disappearance of Antonia "Toñi" Rodríguez Relinque, a 38-year-old intellectually disabled woman who had been seen on various occasions in the company of Delgado, the police accompanied Delgado to El Puerto de Santa María police station where he was questioned by Cádiz's Brigada de Investigación Criminal (Criminal Investigation Division) over the disappearance of the person whom they now knew to be his girlfriend. He initially denied killing her, but following the discovery of her body in a secluded spot known as Pago Galvecito, on the outskirts of El Puerto de Santa María, on 21 February 1971, he confessed to her murder – Delgado confessed that he had strangled the woman with her own tights while they were having sex. The local newspaper, the Diario de Cádiz, dubbed him El estrangulador del Puerto (The Puerto strangler), though this nickname was dropped later at the request of El Puerto's local authorities, who feared the town's name would be tainted. Over the next few days he admitted his guilt in the murders of four others and was considered the definite perpetrator of seven murders in total (including two that had been originally considered accidents) before the investigation was halted and Delgado put in a mental institution without trial or a proper conviction. While under interrogation, Delgado remained calm and shared many details of the crimes with the police.

At the time of his arrest, it was widely reported that he was diagnosed as having XYY syndrome which led to claims that this may have been responsible for his violent behaviour. However, the link between XYY syndrome and violent behaviour has been disproven by modern studies of the condition.

In the process of investigating the veracity of his claims the investigating magistrate of El Puerto de Santa María, Conrado Gallardo Ros, along with detectives involved in the cases, accompanied Delgado to the scenes of the crimes over a period of two years where he re-enacted and explained the crimes. One detective in particular, Salvador Ortega, succeeded in gaining Delgado's trust and was the one who was given the most information. Photos taken during the investigation show Delgado smiling and even embracing the detectives, who used the affectionate form of his name – "Manolo" or even "Manolito". On a side note, Delgado became the first serial killer to travel the scenes of his crimes by aeroplane.

=== Death ===
Manuel Delgado Villegas died on 2 February 1998, at the Hospital Can Ruti in Badalona as a result of chronic obstructive pulmonary disease.

== TV Programmes featuring Delgado Villegas ==
- Cuatro (15 February 2009). "La muerte aparente; El rastro del arropiero; Diarios del Miedo". Cuarto Milenio. Season 4. Episode 24/45. Cuatro.
- * "Entrevista a 'El Arropiero'". Dossier 21. 1993. TVE. La 1.

== See also ==
- List of serial killers by number of victims

== Notes ==
a The nickname was first attributed to his father, a travelling salesman of arrope; Delgado Villegas was in turn known as "The Son of El Arropiero" before it was contracted into El Arropiero. If Delgado Villegas ever sold arrope himself it was between September 1970 and his arrest in January 1971 only, a time when he had returned to El Puerto de Santa María to live with his father.
