= Fashoda State =

State of South Sudan from 2015 to 2020

- State
- Location of Fashoda in South Sudan
- Country: South Sudan
- Capital: Kodok
- Number of Counties: 3

Population (2014 Estimate)
  - Total: 155,602

Fashoda State (previously named Western Nile State) was a state in South Sudan that existed between 2 October 2015 and 22 February 2020. It was located in the Greater Upper Nile region of South Sudan, and it bordered the country of Sudan to the north, and the southern Sudanese states of Eastern Nile to the east, Western Bieh to the southwest, and Ruweng to the west.

== History ==
Before the state was formed, the territory was part of the former state of Upper Nile. On 2 October 2015, President Salva Kiir issued a decree establishing 28 states in place of the 10 constitutionally established states. The decree established the new states largely along ethnic lines. A number of opposition parties and civil society groups challenged the constitutionality of the decree. Kiir later resolved to take it to parliament for approval as a constitutional amendment. In November, the South Sudanese parliament empowered President Kiir to create new states.

William Othuon was appointed Governor on 24 December 2015. Riek Machar appointed Johnson Olony as the new Spla-IO Governor of Fashoda state on 28 July, 2017 replacing Jokuino Fidel Nyikayo in the process.

Fashoda state has suffered with loss of cattle and up to 13 thousand cattle were said have been killed within a month for July of 2018.

== Geography ==
The Western Nile State was part of the Greater Upper Nile region of South Sudan. The state shared borders with Sudan to the north, and the states of Eastern Nile to the east, Western Bieh to the southwest, and Ruweng to the west.

=== Administrative divisions ===
When the state of Western Nile was formed, a total of three administrative divisions compromised the state. The counties that were compromised were Kodok County, Manyo County, and Panyikang County.

=== Population and Towns ===
The town of Kodok was the most populous population cluster in the state. The population of the town in 2012 was placed at 7,709. The town of Kodok was also the capital of the state.
