= Zubair Mohamed Salih =

Sudanese politician (1944–1998)

Lieutenant General Zubair Mohamed Salih
- الزبير محمد صالح

Vice President of Sudan
- In office 27 December 1993 – 12 February 1998
- President: Omar al-Bashir
- Preceded by: Abd al-Rahman Saeed
- Succeeded by: Ali Osman Taha

Deputy chairman of the Revolutionary Command Council for National Salvation
- In office 30 June 1989 – 16 October 1993
- President: Omar al-Bashir
- Preceded by: Post established
- Succeeded by: Post abolished

Personal details
- Born: 1944
- Died: 12 February 1998 (age 53–54)

Military service
- Allegiance: Sudan
- Branch/service: Sudanese Army
- Rank: Lieutenant General

Zubair Mohamed Salih (1944 – 12 February 1998) was a Sudanese soldier and politician. Salih was the deputy of Omar al-Bashir in the military government from 1989 to 1993 and then he continued as al-Bashir's Vice President.

Salih died in the 1998 Sudanese Air Force An-32 crash at Nasir. He was described as a crucial link between the Sudanese Armed Forces and Dr. Hassan al-Turabi's National Islamic Front.

His name is also spelled Zubair Mohammad Salih, Zubeir Mohammed al-Saleh and Al-Zubair Mohamed Saleh.

Political offices
Preceded by Abd al-Rahman Saeed	First Vice President of Sudan; 1993–1998	Succeeded by Ali Osman Taha
