= Lam Akol =

South Sudanese politician

Chairman of the NDM
- Incumbent
- Assumed office 2016

Chairman of the SPLM-DC
- Incumbent
- Assumed office June 2009

Minister of Cabinet Affairs of Sudan
- In office 17 October 2007 – Unknown
- President: Omar al-Bashir
- Preceded by: Deng Alor
- Succeeded by: Dr. Luka Biong

Foreign Minister of Sudan
- In office 20 January 2005 – 17 October 2007
- President: Omar al-Bashir
- Preceded by: Mustafa Osman Ismail
- Succeeded by: Deng Alor

Transport Minister of Sudan
- In office March 1998 – 2002
- President: Omar al-Bashir

Personal details
- Born: July 15, 1950 (age 76) Athidhwoi, Upper Nile
- Party: NDM (since 2016)
- Other political affiliations: National Congress (until 2002); Justice Party (2002-2003); SPLM (2003-2009)
- Education: Imperial College London
- Nickname: Alpha Beta

Military service
- Allegiance: SPLA (1983-1991); SPLA-Nasir (1991-2002)
- Battles/wars: Second Sudanese Civil War

Lam Akol Ajawin, is a South Sudanese politician of Shilluk descent. He is the current leader of National Democratic Movement (NDM) party. He is a former high-ranking official in the Sudan People's Liberation Army (SPLA), and subsequently became the Foreign Minister of Sudan from September 2005 to October 2007, when the Khartoum government offered the SPLA several other key ministries as part of a peace agreement.

== Early life ==
Akol was born on 15 July 1950 in Athidhwoi, Upper Nile. He received a Ph.D. in chemical engineering from Imperial College London and taught at the University of Khartoum.

== SPLA ==
Akol joined the SPLA in 1986 after having been a clandestine member since October 1983. In 1991 he joined Riek Machar and Gordon Kong to break from the SPLA and form the SPLA-Nasir. On 5 April 1993, after they were joined by William Nyuon Bany and they joined forces with another faction under Kerubino Kwanyin Bol, the name of their faction was changed to SPLA-United.

Akol was dismissed by Machar in February 1994 and became chairman of one faction of SPLM/A-United following unity with senior SPLA commanders who were under detention by orders of John Garang. He subsequently signed the Fashoda Peace Agreement with the government in 1997 and was appointed in March 1998 Sudan's Minister of Transportation, a post he held for four years. In 2002 Akol resigned from the ruling National Congress (NCP), and became a key member of the newly-formed opposition Justice Party. He, with most of his forces, rejoined the SPLA in October 2003.

In 2005 Akol wrote a piece detailing his role as a negotiator on behalf of Garang in the initiation of Operation Lifeline Sudan.

In October 2007, the SPLM withdrew from the Khartoum government; it demanded, among other things, that Akol be removed from his position as Minister of Foreign Affairs, as he was accused of being too close to the regime. The Chairman of SPLM nominated him as Minister of Cabinet Affairs which was confirmed on 17 October by President Omar al-Bashir, and appointed Deng Alor, a leading SPLM member (member of the SPLM political bureau) who had previously been the Minister of Cabinet Affairs, to replace Akol as Foreign Minister.

== NDM and SSOA Coalition ==
In May 7, 2025, Dr. Lam Akol Ajawin was appointed as the minister of Transport from the South Sudan Opposition Alliance (SSOA) coalition.

== International Forum ==
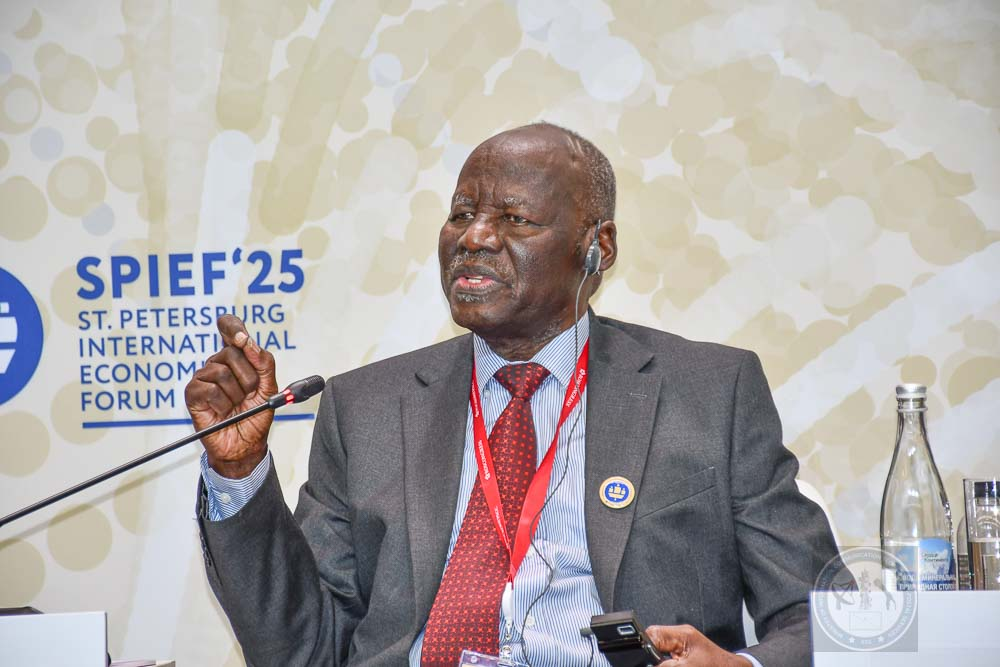
Lam Akol Ajawin – National Minister of Transport at the Plenary session at SPIEF’2025

On 20 June 2025, Akol questioned the membership of an African Country to be one of the Permanent Members of the UNSC during the SPIEF event.

== Bibliography ==
- Lam Akol (2001). SPLM/SPLA: Inside an African Revolution (1st ed.). Khartoum University Press. ISBN 978-99942-990-6-5.
- Lam Akol (2003). SPLM/SPLA: the Nasir Declaration. iUniverse. ISBN 0-595-28459-0.
- Lam Akol (2007). Southern Sudan: colonialism, resistance, and autonomy. The Red Sea Press, Inc. ISBN 978-1-56902-264-1.

Preceded by Mustafa Osman Ismail	Foreign Minister of Republic of Sudan; 2005–2007	Succeeded by Deng Alor
