= Borscht Film Festival =

Film festival held in Miami, Florida

- Location: Miami, Florida, United States
- Founded: 2005
- Most recent: 2019
- Hosted by: Borscht Corporation
- Language: English
- Website: https://www.borsc.ht/

The Borscht Film Festival is a film festival organized by the Borscht Corporation held in Miami, Florida roughly every 18–24 months. The festival's mission is to tell Miami stories, forging the cinematic identity of the city. While most of the films screened are commissioned specifically for the festival by the Borscht Corporation, they also accept works where the subject matter or filmmaker has some tie to South Florida.

Known as "the weirdest film festival on the planet," the festival is characterized by a gonzo sensibility, sense of spectacle, and focus on regional storytelling. While critics of the festival point out its chaotic structure, they also acknowledge that it is part of an overall ethos that is "teeming with lunacy and inspired imagination." It has been lauded for its "visionary and experimental organizational methods” with Filmmaker Magazine going as far as to recognize it as the most conceptually bold film festival of its era, and also a reinvention of the concept of a film festival.

Over the years the festival grew from a small, one night underground screening of student films to an internationally recognized event that became influential in the world of independent film for its inspired programming and curation, supporting the early work of artists like Jillian Mayer, Barry Jenkins, Tarell Alvin McCraney, John Wilson, Terence Nance, Rachel Rossin, and more. Films that first played at the Borscht Festival later went on to screen at Cannes, Sundance, Toronto, SXSW, and various other festivals.

The Borscht Film Festival was founded by Lucas Levya and a group of New World School of the Arts alums in 2005.

== History ==
=== 2003-2004 ===
The origins of the festival are traced to a series of events by a group of New World School of the Arts students in 2004. There was no film program at the public high school, so students from different art programs pooled equipment and resources to help each other create short films based on different challenges inspired by The Five Obstructions.

They would then host parties with names such as "Smudged" and "UnMinced" to screen the finished films for each other and their peers.

=== 2005-2008 ===
After graduating high school in 2005, the group continued to collaborate on videos. With most of the filmmakers attending schools out of state, and no place to showcase their movies locally, Leyva organized the first official Borscht Film Festival on December 30, 2005 at the Miami Shores Performing Arts Theater. It was hosted by a functional robot named Paris Hilton.

The 2nd Borscht Film Festival took place on August 2, 2007 at the Miami Science Museum Planetarium. Attendees were encouraged to bring sleeping bags.

By 2008 Leyva had moved back to Miami from New York. His time away made him realize the untapped cinematic potential of the city. He began collaborating with Andrew Hevia to refocus the festival on regional storytelling. They formed a collective with other like-minded artists under the CCCV (Roman numeral for 305, Miami's area code) banner and issued a manifesto.

CCCV collectively made 17 films, each about a different neighborhood in Miami, and screened them at the Tower Theater in Little Havana on December 27, 2008. The attendance at the event far exceeded capacity, which prompted a visit from the fire marshal.

=== 2009 ===
In 2009 they were able to procure support from a local pineapple-flavored soda called Jupiña and others to commission 5 original short films from filmmakers under the age of 30 (including the first screenplay by Tarell Alvin McCraney), each representing a different neighborhood in Miami.

They screened these shorts, as well as others from local filmmakers, at the next Borscht Film Festival. The screening sold out the 1700-seat Gusman Theater in downtown Miami, with people attempting to scalp the free tickets to those waiting outside the over-capacity venue.

The 2009 festival expanded to three days and took place November 28–30, 2009. Other programming included a symposium on locally based director Michael Bay at the fictional University of Wynwood, and a bike-in movie to see Medicine for Melancholy by Miami native Barry Jenkins at Sweat Records in Little Haiti.

Local press noted the festivals emergence from the underground. From an article titled “Borscht Film Festival is Miami's alt-culture summit” in the Miami Herald:

“I've been watching culture in Miami for two decades now, and this felt like a critical mass that was new. Miami's always bred talent - but it doesn't usually manage to keep it. Too hard to get produced, too hard to make the power brokers pay attention to anything new and young, too hard to find a new space when the few available resources are taken up by figures that have been ensconced for a long time. Maybe the Borscht Festival, and its like, can change that.”

The 2009 Borscht Film Festival was awarded "Best Film Festival" by the Miami New Times in their annual "Best of Miami" awards.

It marked the first time their work was noticed outside of Miami, as commissioned shorts later screened at Cannes, Tribeca and Sundance Film Festivals respectively, and Jillian Mayer’s Scenic Jogging was chosen as one of the winners of YouTube Play Creative Video Biennial and screened at Guggenheim Museums around the world.

=== 2011: Borscht 7 ===
In 2010, Borscht was awarded their first grant by the Knight Foundation. The 23-year-old festival director accepted the award with the Knight Foundation logo shaved into his head, which convinced CEO Alberto Ibargüen to support them. With the funding, they created a free open call for Miami movie pitches and founded the Borscht Corporation to oversee production of the commissioned films.

The 2011 festival expanded to two weekends, taking place between April 16 and April 23, 2011. Events featured a 15 foot tall piñata filled with adderall named James Francco, a campaign speech and performance by 2 Live Crew front man Uncle Luke (then running for Mayor of Miami-Dade), homemade robot battles in a thunderdome, and a stunt where in the month leading up to the festival, their offices became a public exhibition in a Wynwood art gallery where the staff of the fest lived and worked and visitors could observe them 24 hours a day.

The main night took place at the Adrienne Arsht Center, where new films premiered before a capacity crowd of 1800, with an overflow line that snaked around the block to Biscayne Boulevard.

This festival was branded Borscht 7, although it appears there were only four previous iterations of the Borscht Film Festival.

It was the first time the festival and its filmmakers were noticed by national press, including a journalist who wrote in Vice Magazine:

"Miami is the surface-capable city where if you're a local or student filmmaker, one either sticks around to pursue making ads for, say, Crispin Porter, or relocates to Los Angeles or New York City (the very cities that have placed a stronghold on Miami's media and filmic iconography for decades.) Suddenly, in a single season, the place is in favor of handing $150 thousand and professional resources over to the kind of heady, collective 23-year-old energy that dependably says, "F*** Hollywood. We can do this all ourselves. Our stop signs shall be famous also." Technology and a nasty wake of dreamers have seemingly come to a head, allowing Borscht's 20-somethings to plant a flag, and allowing Miami's denizens, naturally, to realize there's money to be made, and an identity to be seized, cultivated, and home grown."

The journalist also noted the unusual (at the time) practice of embracing online videos in their programming. Several of the shorts did in fact go viral on YouTube and Vimeo, and many went on to screen at other festivals around the world, including a 2nd year in a row at Sundance. The collective broke through at Sundance 2012 with a remake of La Jetée by Mayer and festival director Lucas Leyva titled Life and Freaky Times of Uncle Luke. They promoted the film with airbrushed posters and whoopee cushions bearing Uncle Luke's face left on theater seats before films which became highly sought after collector items, and hosting booty bass parties with Uncle Luke, who had taken them under his wing saying:

"When I look at these Borscht guys, they remind me so much of myself when I was starting with music and it was unheard of to be a rapper from the South... They’re going through the same struggle right now"

This and 3 other works by Mayer & Leyva were in competition at SXSW that same year, landing them a spot on Filmmaker Magazine's "25 New Faces of Independent Film" list. Another short, Chlorophyl, was the first movie by Barry Jenkins set in his home town, and set the stage for his return to make what would eventually become Moonlight. In contemporaneous interviews he foreshadowed his return:

“I’m now working with [playwright] Tarell Alvin McCraney on a triptych feature about Liberty City that Borscht is producing, and this is the thing: Tarell and I grew up three blocks from each other. We went to the same high school. We have very similar stories and yet I’d have never met this cat were it not for Borscht."

=== 2012: Borscht 8 ===
In 2012, the festival was scheduled to coincide with the Mayan Apocalypse from December 12 to 21, 2012 (stylized as 12.12.12-12.21.12). It expanded to 9 days to include presentations from additional film collectives based in other regional centers, including Court 13 from New Orleans. The stated purpose of this "regional film summit" was to build community within the loose network of regional independent film centers around the world towards a new distribution model.

In the lead-up to the festival, Borscht falsely claimed that Miami Heat player Chris Bosh donated 1% of his salary to rename their event "The Bosh Film Festival." This was later revealed to be a marketing stunt in promotion of an animated film titled Adventures of Christopher Bosh in the Multiverse! wherein the basketball player was posited to be a disgraced extradimensional prince pretending to be a human. When Bosh threatened legal action, the festival publicly released the cease and desist letters, digitally vandalized with the text "all life is real life" and an animated broadsword-wielding Bosh. In interviews the filmmakers claimed that the film was a documentary commissioned by Bosh himself, and that our world was in danger. The NBA responded with a cease and desist letter of their own. The filmmakers held everything they said was true somewhere in the multiverse. The controversy was the subject of an article in The Miami Herald sports section which began “Chris Bosh is definitely not a disgraced space prince. And his attorneys want to make sure he is not portrayed as one.”

Borscht then actually hosted an event during the festival called "The Bosh Film Festival" at the Miami Art Museum wherein anyone could bring their own projector and play whatever they wanted. It also hosted early musical performances by Yung Jake, Hundred Waters, and a man in an alligator costume singing ballads. The titular film did not screen at this event, perhaps for legal reasons. It did however, have a surprise screening at the main event at the opera house the following night, where the audience went wild.

When asked about the incident Chris Bosh said “Kind of left it alone, I didn’t want to get involved.”

Other festival events happened at a condemned Marine Stadium, a Jai Alai fronton, marine biology laboratory, and Versailles, where they staged Fidel Castro’s death years before it actually happened. They also played footage of psychedelic sea life on the largest permanently established projection surface in North America, hypnotized filmmaker Amy Seimetz for a Q&A of her own film, and staged a "celebrity animal petting zoo" in an independent cinema.

The response to the festival was positive, with local press calling it a triumphant return and their best iteration. It was the first time national press covered the festival en masse, who lauded it for its experiential programs, being a really good time, and articulating Miami's underground "unlike I ever imagined residing beneath the main stage of palms, thongs and tans" as a "freaky force to be reckoned with." The regional film summit was viewed positively for creating a broader networked collective of regional communities and filmmaking scenes which impacted the indie film world at large. The editor of Filmmaker Magazine called it their favorite film event of the year.

In addition to a new round of local short film commissions, including collaborations with local musicians Otto von Schirach, Blowfly, Jacuzzi Boys, and DJ Laz, they had invited guest filmmakers such as native Floridian Amy Seimetz, Adan Jodorowsky, Ray Tintori, Celia Rowlson-Hall, Julia Pott and others to collaborate on Miami-set films. These were premiered at the main event at the Arsht Center.

Many of these original films went on to screen at festivals and win awards globally, to the extent that at SXSW that year, 5 of the 34 shorts in competition came from Borscht. Among them were the works by Seimetz, Rowlson-Hall, Bernardo Britto, and a musical by Mayer & Leyva which brought Borscht back to Sundance for a third consecutive year. When the Bosh animation was released online, it went viral.

=== 2014: Borscht 9 ===
The next edition took place December 17–21, 2014. Titled Borscht 9, it featured increasingly outlandish events bigger in scope than previous iterations. They created a "space program" called MASA (Miami Aeronautics and Space Administration) and claimed to launch a hard drive containing their films into orbit to achieve an “interplanetary premiere” using weather balloons. They were given control of a 13-story LED screen on the side of a building on Biscayne Bay, and used it to write existential messages directed at dolphins and manatees who might be reading from the ocean.

They also hosted a machete fencing workshop, threw a fake Criterion Collection release party for a local con man, and built a large scale “theme park” based on their short films, complete with DIY rides, hydraulic sharks, and EKG-controlled carnival games.

In the lead-up to the festival, they remade Brian De Palma’s Scarface by crowdsourcing 15 second clips, then premiered it at Mansion Nightclub on South Beach (formerly a movie palace) by turning it back into a movie theater for one night.

At some point there was a 3am screening in a nondescript hotel room where most of the attendants were allegedly on psychedelic drugs. They also hosted a bodybuilding competition titled "Mr. Borscht," an outdoor screening of the Miami-set Ace Ventura designed for pets, a retrospective for fictional lothario Jose El Rey, and a laser light show in a planetarium dome narrated by Kool AD of Das Racist. The keynote speech was given by the holographic floating head of a digital DJ Khaled at Stiltsville, a neighborhood of floating houses in the middle of the ocean.

They also installed a pool inside a local bar in order to host a pool party for the premiere of No Seasons, a "surreality show" based on a short from Borscht 7 picked up by MTV, starring Julian Yuri Rodriguez, who attributed his own success to being "a very pretty boy and I think people just like looking at pretty people on a screen." Rodriguez also made national waves as a filmmaker for his controversial shorts and his experiments transporting senior citizens to Cuba using an early Oculus Rift developer kit.

Other commissioned films included a collaboration between artist Jacolby Satterwhite and rapper Trina, Sebastian Silva and a pod of dolphins, as well as works by Terence Nance, the first art film made entirely in King of Diamonds strip club, and an unauthorized sequel to Cool as Ice starring a pirated Vanilla Ice.

The public response was once again positive, with local journalists declaring the filmmaking boom in South Florida the "Miami New Wave," led by Borscht and the various independent cinemas, film companies, and organizations that emerged in their wake:

"With its broad reach, user-friendly interactive events and atmosphere combining irreverence and serious art, Borscht has become the crown jewel in a now-burgeoning Miami filmmaking scene. And the world is taking notice."

The growing international awareness was reflected by press reactions that were befuddled by its chaotic nature yet overall revelatory. Filmmaker Magazine called it “a spirited and distinctly local reinvention of not just the concept of the film festival but also the entire notion of a regional presenting organization”, an IndieWire headline called it "the weirdest film festival on the planet", Moviemaker Magazine named it one of the "coolest film festivals in the world" and in Artforum, Nick Pinkerton wrote "if not the world, then Borscht has a decent claim on owning Miami."

With programmers from international festivals now attending, Borscht became a launchpad for film festival runs and careers. Bernardo Britto's short Yearbook won the Sundance Jury Prize in 2014, then in 2015 two more Borscht shorts returned to Sundance, and in 2016 five Borscht projects premiered at the festival. Some festivals played the entire Borscht lineup, such as the Glasgow Short Film Festival and the Key West Film Festival, which led to the headline "Is the Next Great Hope of American Film Hiding In Florida?"

=== 2016: Borscht 9.5 ===
In 2016, they announced a surprise "flash" festival with one week’s notice titled Borscht 9.5, programmed against the Miami International Film Festival’s GEMS festival, held at the same time from October 12–15, 2016. In a coup, Moonlight held its Miami premiere at Borscht 9.5, choosing them over the much larger Miami International Film Festival for their role in its development.

This, coupled with the Borscht 9.5's official web domain of realmiamigems.com and tagline of “cuz the real gems were made in Miami bro” led to a feud where the Miami International Film Festival director called Borscht “unoriginal” and derisively referred to them as “the soup festival,” a nickname which Borscht later used on their merch.

In an interview, the Borscht director purported to be unaware of Miami Film Festival’s GEMs, saying their tagline had been inspired by the films they were screening being akin to gemstones: “Like, MA is an emerald, Jacqueline is musgravite, Moonlight is a ruby, etc.” Filmmaker Magazine called it a "pointless beef."

Afterwards, the Miami International Film Festival launched programs and cash prizes to support locally made movies to encourage more local filmmakers to participate, showing a renewed focus on Miami stories.

Besides Moonlight, Borscht 9.5 premiered other feature films they were involved in developing, such as Celia Rowlson-Hall's MA and Bernardo Britto's Jacqueline Argentine, as well as a new short by Sam Kuhn.

=== 2017: Borscht Diez ===
In the years after Borscht 9, the festival and the output of the Borscht Corporation traveled the world through retrospectives hosted in Europe and in the US, including the IFP Center in New York.

With hundreds of screenings at other festivals, museums, awards, and another two projects screening at Sundance in 2017 with four more to follow in 2018, their total reached 17 films across eight consecutive years. This presence, as well as the many of filmmakers who got their start at Borscht now working on Hollywood or television projects was indicative of their impact and presence across the independent film world.

While it was still a small underground operation known mostly to Miami locals, the festival had established an international cult following from emerging filmmakers and festival programmers as one of the last truly unique and transgressive experiences in film. Its brand was so distinct for baffling Hollywood while seeking to work in the realm of spectacle that it was mentioned along with far larger and more established global festivals. For instance, an article began "The Toronto International Film Festival may not have the prestige of Cannes, the casual chic of Sundance, or even the self-conscious eccentricity of Miami’s Borscht Film Festival, but many sources suggest it is the largest..."

Locally, Borscht had become part of the city’s cultural character, and its focus on regional Miami storytelling had become mainstreamed, paving the way for new art house cinemas, festivals, and organizations. They legitimized the premise of filmmaking in Miami, received an award from the Florida Film Critics Circle, and MIFF changed their rules in order to be able to screen Borscht films.

When Moonlight was nominated for eight Academy Awards, it represented a great validation but also an existential crisis for the festival. The festival’s mission was to carve a space for Miami filmmakers on the global stage, and provide the requisite support to reach it. The success of Moonlight and other projects forced them to consider whether their mission was still relevant, openly asking "Does it matter? And if it doesn't, why are we doing it?"

Borscht 10 or Borscht Diez (the Spanish word for “ten” and a play on "dies") was announced as what would ostensibly be the final Borscht Film Festival when a Miami New Times reporter found an obituary on a memorial website.

Borscht Diez took place February 22–26, 2017. It began with a party at a funeral home with art installations, musical performances, film screenings inside of coffins, and a wake for themselves leading to a motorcade and procession where a coffin allegedly carrying hard drives containing all of their films was set ablaze with fireworks in the Florida Everglades.

Other events included an aquatic parade with Jet Skis, boats, and hovercraft to Stiltsville, a "time travel booze cruise," and a happening called "No New Waves" on an uninhabited island in Biscayne Bay accessible only by kayak, from which attendees could watch the film Waterworld as it played on a giant floating LED billboard, or wander to find smaller screens scattered amid the island’s trees showing short films, art installations or performances. Neon Indian and Jacuzzi Boys performed on this island as well. Allegedly, the event was improperly permitted, and the festival pretended to cancel the event to throw off police, leading to criticism that Borscht Festivals implicated attendees in potentially dangerous criminal activity.

Another evening they turned the Frank Gehry-designed New World Symphony on Miami Beach into what they described as a “psychedelic haunted house” for an event titled “Coral Orgy.” The interior of the space was projection mapped with close-up footage of ejaculating coral reefs captured by marine biologists and frequent collaborators Coral Morphologic, and in the main auditorium Animal Collective performed a live score to the psychedelic invertebrate erotica. Elsewhere in the building visitors would find a live opera about tripping on mushrooms, a Bermuda Triangle ritual by Otto von Shirach, performances by Hot Sugar and Jacolby Satterwhite, and various installations including a new work by Rachel Rossin and a “George W. Bush Simulator” wherein the user lays in an actual bathtub and virtually inhabits the body of the former president as he peacefully works on a painting in his tub. Animal Collective’s performance was to be released as an audiovisual album titled Tangerine Reef, however it required rerecording as the Borscht crowd was too rowdy.

The main screening of original short films was at the Olympia Theater, preceded by a live opera and two nude people bouncing on a dolphin while sponsor logos appeared on screen. Afterwards a party took place in an old art deco bank that featured a performance by rapper Trina on top of the bank vault and vogue battles. The party ended in a brawl involving the festival director. When asked by Newsweek about the melee, the director pointed to a cut on his face and said “this is what audience building looks like.”

More events included a film screening for cacti, an early retrospective for John Wilson's documentaries, a screening of Pootie Tang in 35mm, the taping of a live gameshow called Shart Tank, a screening at a Polish bath house, and a "rival" festival-within-the-festival called the West Kendall International Film Festival. At a series of talks, the festival director presented a PDF explaining how it was essential to purchase a speedboat as the first step in making a feature film. It is difficult to discern which events actually happened, as they have been known to program fake events or pretend to cancel them in order to distract authorities from real events of dubious legality.

Their final event was a block party to watch the Academy Awards on a giant inflatable screen and root for Moonlight in Liberty City, the neighborhood where most of the film takes place and from which the writer and director hail. The event was plagued by the video feed intermittently cutting out throughout the night, which added drama to the mix-up where La La Land was announced as Best Picture winner and the feed froze. The audience began to leave only for the feed to resume just as the Moonlight filmmakers were accepting the award, which incited a euphoric celebration that lasted until the following morning. A journalist summed up the moment:

"It was magical and it was improbable, but just like the journey of Borscht, both that week and over the past decade, it somehow made perfect sense. Independent filmmaking won. Miami won. Moonlight won. Of course they did."

Press reception to the festival was almost ecstatic. It was called one of the greatest film festival lineups ever, named the best overall festival in Miami, and "the type of triumph indie film has so rarely had on the mass culture stage... We all went home asking the right questions about what a film festival could be in the world. The fun was immense."

On the occasion of what was announced to be their final festival, alums and attendees reflected on the past decade of the organization's life-changing impact and others described it as visionary, inspiring, and the most conceptually bold film festival of its era.

=== 2019: Borscht 0 ===
Despite organizer's claims that the 2017 edition would be their last, in 2018 they received $1.25 million in new funding from the Knight Foundation to continue.

However, instead of using the funding to continue their activities with Borscht 11, they opted to reboot the organization and hand over the resources to a new, younger group of Miami filmmakers. It was explained that the festival was initially founded with the intent of never showing the films of anyone over 30, but now many of the organizers had crossed that decade line. Having deemed the initial mission of the festival accomplished, it was up to a new generation to determine what was needed next.

Borscht created a Fellowship Program to identify and train this new generation of artists, programmers, and event producers to take over. The fellows organized themselves into a collective called Bisque Corp, led by Trevor Bazile. With usual festival organizers working on the anthology feature film Omniboat: A Fast Boat Fantasia, Borscht 0 would represent the rebirth of the festival and a passing of the torch to Bisque Corp.

Taking place November 15-24, 2019, Borscht 0 events included film screenings, multimedia performances, midnight puppet shows by Poncili Creacion, and inflatable art installations. It was hosted at venues including a masonic temple, a skate park, a Hungarian community center, a speedboat, a reggaeton warehouse party, a jungle garden, a defunct Burdine’s department store, a pop-up theater called the Firebird, and Santa’s Enchanted Forest, the world’s largest holiday theme park.

== Borscht Corporation ==
The Borscht Corporation is the 501(c)(3) nonprofit production company that organizes the Borscht Film Festival and creates short films and videos in and about the city of Miami, Florida. In addition to hosting the quasi-annual film festival that screens their work, Borscht Corp. provides financial and technical support to filmmakers commissioned to make work in and about the city of Miami, Florida. They solicit projects through open calls asking for project ideas from artists from, living in, or inspired by South Florida to receive funding, production, or development support. They seek out both first-time filmmakers from the community and invite guest filmmakers to collaborate.

After screening as rough cuts at the Borscht Film Festival, the films have gone one to screen at hundreds of festivals and venues worldwide.

=== Accolades ===
- 19 short films commissioned by Borscht Corp have screened at the Sundance Film Festival, with 2 of them winning Jury Prizes.
- In each of the 2016 and 2018 editions of Sundance, Borscht had 4 projects in competition at Sundance.
- 14 Borscht Corp short films have screened at SXSW Film Festival, with 3 winning jury prizes.
- 8 Borscht Corporation short films have screened at AFI Fest, with 3 winning jury prizes.
- 10 Borscht Corp short films have been acquired by The Criterion Collection and to stream on The Criterion Channel.
- As of 2018, Borscht Corp shorts have collectively won 51 awards at film festivals.
- At least 21 Borscht Corp commissions have been selected as Vimeo Staff Picks.
- Bernardo Britto's animated shorts Places Where We Lived and Yearbook were both awarded the Animated Short Grand Jury Prize at the AFI Fest in 2013 and 2014, respectively. His short film Glove received the Animated Short Grand Jury Award at the 2016 SXSW Film Festival.
- Britto's animated short Yearbook received the Short Film Jury Prize at the Sundance Film Festival in 2014.
- Valerio's Day Out by Michael Arcos received the Short Film Jury Prize Sundance Film Festival in 2020.
- In 2015, Mayer\Leyva's web series NO SEASONS with Julian Yuri Rodriguez—produced in association with MTV—received a Webby Award for Outstanding Reality Series.

=== Reception ===
Borscht Corp. was the subject of several dedicated retrospectives and showcases, including at CERN in Geneva, Switzerland as part of the Cineglobe International Film Festival, the Independent Filmmaker Project's Media Center in Brooklyn, New York, the Incubate (Festival) in Netherlands, and at the New Orleans, Key West, and Glasgow Film Festivals.

13 of Borscht Corp.'s core members and alumni—Bernardo Britto, Lucas Leyva and Jillian Mayer, Terence Nance, Celia Rowlson-Hall, Marnie Ellen Hertzler, Barry Jenkins, Alex Lim Haas, Robin Comisar, Sam Kuhn, Faren Humes, Keisha Rae Witherspoon and Sebastián Silva—have been named to Filmmaker Magazine's annual list of the "25 New Faces of Independent Film."
