= Lucas Leyva =

American film director

Lucas Leyva (born October 25, 1986) is an American director, screenwriter, and producer. He has written and directed multiple acclaimed short films (often in collaboration with visual artist Jillian Mayer), as well as several music videos for bands such as Arcade Fire, Jacuzzi Boys, and Hundred Waters. Leyva is the founder of the Borscht Film Festival and the Borscht Corporation.

== Early life and education ==
Leyva was born and raised in Miami, Florida. He graduated from New World School of the Arts high school in 2005 where he studied theater. He is a 2005 YoungArts alumnus. Then, he graduated from Fordham University in 2008 where he studied communications and visual art after being expelled from the theater program. Both of his parents are from Cuba.

== Career ==
Leyva wrote his first one-act play when he was sixteen and it was published by Playscripts inc while he was still in high school.

In 2009 he founded a theater company called Foryoucansee Theater with Marco Ramirez and Alex Fumero. Their first production was an original reggaeton musical titled Toners in Time.

His directorial debut was the 2009 short film Day N Night Out from a screenplay by Tarell Alvin McCraney, which screened at the Cannes Film Festival.

In 2010 he began what would become a decade-long collaboration with visual artist Jillian Mayer by producing her short film Scenic Jogging. It was shown at the Guggenheim Museum in New York in 2010 as part of YouTube Play, and was selected as one of the event's 25 winners, which were also shown at the sister museums in Bilbao, Berlin, and Venice.

The next year they released the one minute short film I Am Your Grandma on YouTube, which went viral with over 4 million views. The film features Mayer giving a message to her eventual grandchildren in a variety of strange, futuristic costumes. CBS blogger William Goodman described it as "oddly hypnotizing," and it was selected to screen at many film festivals and art galleries.

His followup effort was the screenplay for 2012's Life and Freaky Times of Uncle Luke, which he co-directed with Mayer. A remake of Chris Marker’s La Jetee starring Luther Campbell, the short film premiered at the 2012 Sundance Film Festival, and later played SXSW. Sundance programmer Mike Plante referred to it as “an incredibly original film, both in terms of its tone and the technique of its storytelling” with “a very healthy disrespect for convention and authority." The short was called “mindblowing,” "both very smart and gleefully nuts" and “a work of whacked-out originality and manic invention” by Filmmaker Magazine and named “one of 25 essential shorts from over a century of cinema” by Fandor. The film is part of the permanent collection at the Perez Art Museum Miami and was acquired by the Criterion Collection.

In 2012 he and Mayer directed a music video under the pseudonyms “Jacuzzi Gals” for the song Glazin' by Miami garage rock band Jacuzzi Boys. The video briefly went viral before it was banned for having vagina puppets. It was called the “best music vid of the year” by Eric Wareheim of Tim and Eric and “the worst music video ever” by Joseph Kahn (director of the Thong Song music video). The controversial video and legal drama surrounding it were the subject of a SXSW panel in 2013 titled “Vagina Puppets and Fair Use.”

In 2012 his short film Reinaldo Arenas, starring his father and narrated by a dying shark, premiered at the 2012 Slamdance Film Festival and played SXSW. It was called “a beautiful metaphor” by the Miami New Times.

In 2012, four different Mayer/Leyva projects were in competition at SXSW, landing them a spot on Filmmaker Magazine’s "25 New Faces of Independent Film" list.

The next year he reteamed with Mayer for 2013's #PostModem, a short musical film based on the theories of futurist Ray Kurzweil. The film premiered at the 2013 Sundance Film Festival, played SXSW, New York Film Festival, and MoMA as part of the Filmmaker Magazine 25 year retrospective. It was called “one of the 10 most stunning independent movies at Sundance” by Huffington Post and “among the best, the strangest, and the most entertaining films at SXSW” by TIME Magazine. The film was considered a "favorite of Sundance 2013" by IndieWire. Although it was originally intended to be developed into a feature film, Mayer and Leyva eventually realized that their concept was too expensive, despite being supported by Sundance's 2013 New Frontier Story Lab.

Mayer and Leyva also teamed up with Bleeding Palm in 2013 to make the animated short film Adventures of Christopher Bosh in the Multiverse!, which tells a fantastical story of Miami basketball star Christopher Bosh and faced legal action from Bosh's lawyers and representatives.

In 2014 he wrote and directed the short film The Coral Reef are Dreaming Again. Created in collaboration with marine biologists Coral Morphologic, it tells the story of two corals living in the underwater remains of Miami and premiered at the 2014 Slamdance Film Festival where it was nominated for a grand jury prize.

In 2014, the Glasgow Short Film Festival hosted a retrospective of his work.

In 2014 he reteamed with Mayer for yet another short film, Cool As Ice 2, described as an unauthorized sequel to the 1991 feature film Cool as Ice. According to Indiewire, the script by Leyva recounts Vanilla Ice’s rise and fall using voiceover pulled in part from his discredited autobiography, but is also a rumination on notions of failure found in the poems of Frank O’Hara and Vladimir Mayakovsky, and features a talking, dying sun that provides the main counterpoint to Ice’s attempt to get to the bottom of his post fame woes. The film was described as "side-splittingly funny" and an "absolute showstopper" with "the audacity to power a half dozen inspired features” in Indiewire and “wildly clever, insanely absurd, and surprisingly emotionally compelling” in Bullet. In a review in Art Forum, critic Nick Pinkerton said “Cool as Ice 2 proves them boundlessly resourceful artists, getting a maximum of coup de theater effect from a minimum of resources. It gets across more cinematic awe, feeling, unexpected humor, and take-home ideas than Christopher Nolan’s Interstellar, in one-eighth the time and God knows what fraction of the budget.“ Despite the positive reception, the film has not been screen publicly since, nor released online.

In 2015, he created and directed a web series called No Seasons for MTV, a “surreality show exploring the underbelly of Miami” featuring Miami personality Julian Yuri Rodriguez as an unreliable narrator. No Seasons received a Webby Award for Outstanding Reality Series in 2016.

In 2015, the IFP Center hosted a retrospective of his work.

In 2016, filmmakers Barry Jenkins and Tarell Alvin McCraney credited Leyva and producer Andrew Hevia with the genesis of the collaboration that would lead to the creation of the Miami-set Moonlight. Director Barry Jenkins has said that without Leyva and Hevia, Moonlight "would not exist." The film would go on to win three Oscars, including the Academy Award for Best Picture and the Academy Award for Best Adapted Screenplay at the 89th Academy Awards in 2017. Moonlight has been cited as one of the best films of the 21st century.

His most recent short was 2017's Kaiju Bunraku, based on a play he wrote for a 24-hour theater festival. The film, made entirely with bunraku puppets, premiered at the 2017 Sundance Film Festival and later played Fantastic Fest, where it won a jury award for “Biggest Facemelter.” Known as the first Mothra film to make it to Sundance, the short was called “a technical masterpiece” by IndieWire, “breathtakingly beautiful” by the Fountain, and “a singular vision executed with flawless abandon” in an Eye on Film review. It was acquired by The Criterion Collection to be paired with the film Mothra vs. Godzilla on the streaming platform Criterion Channel.

In response to years of frustration at his inability to get financing for his own feature film ideas, Leyva created a satirical PDF ostensibly pitching potential investors on the idea of buying him a speedboat rather than financing an independent film. Although it began as a joke, the pitch was effective in that it convinced investors to buy him an actual speedboat and became the basis of the 2020 omnibus feature film Omniboat: A Fast Boat Fantasia, which Leyva co-wrote and co-directed with Daniels, Hannah Fidell, Alexa Lim Haas, Olivia Lloyd, Phil Lord, Jillian Mayer, The Meza Brothers, Terence Nance, Brett Potter, Dylan Redford, Xander Robin, Julian Yuri Rodriguez, and Celia Rowlson-Hall The film is made up of several different stories chronicling the life of Lay'n Pipe, a 47-foot TopGun Cigarette boat, from its conception through the end of human civilization.

Omniboat: A Fast Boat Fantasia premiered on January 26, 2020, at the 2020 Sundance Film Festival as part of the NEXT category. The film received mixed reviews, though critics praised the film's originality.

Dennis Harvey of Variety gave the film a mixed review, describing it as "an absurdist delight until it wears out its welcome" and an "adventurous experiment with some great bits, and might yet achieve the cult status that would’ve been ensured by a less unwieldy scope" concluding "there’s so much crazy invention to this project, it’s a pity the whole is exhaustingly so much less than the sum of its parts."

Ben Pearson of /Film gave the film a positive review, calling it "the wildest movie of Sundance 2020" and "an inexplicable, unforgettable, see-it-to-believe-it ode to one of the country’s most unique cities." He goes on to conclude "in a world in which Hollywood is dominated by intellectual property, I'm thrilled that these filmmakers willed into existence a piece of IP that's actually intellectual, as well as being bonkers, bizarre, and occasionally brilliant. I wouldn't even begin to know how to give this a traditional number rating, so instead I'll simply suggest that if you're an adventurous moviegoer and the opportunity ever arises to see this, grab as many of your friends as possible and check it out."
