= Borscht Corporation =

Film and video nonprofit organisation in Miami, Florida, USA

The Borscht Corporation
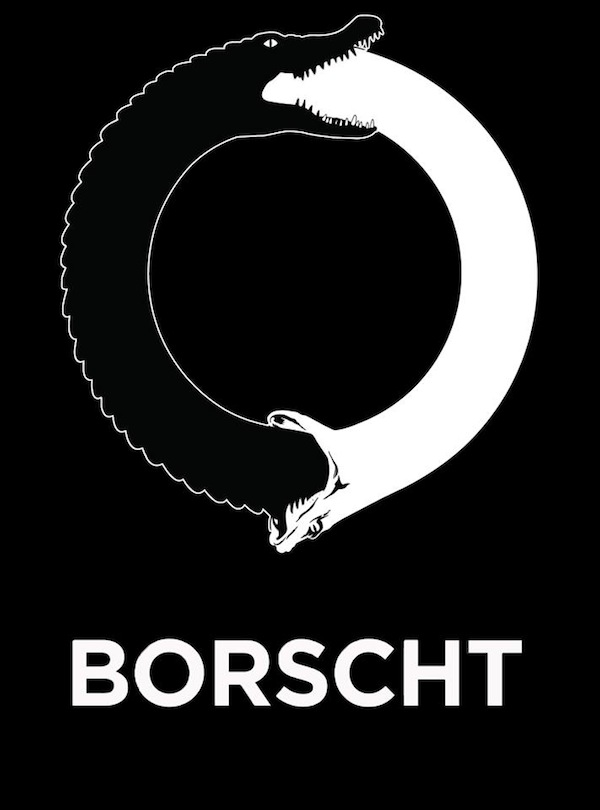
- The Borscht Corp. ouroboros
- Type: Nonprofit
- Headquarters: Miami, Florida, US

The Borscht Corporation is a 501(c)(3) nonprofit that creates short films and videos in and about the city of Miami, Florida. In addition to hosting a quasi-annual film festival that screens their work, Borscht Corp. provides financial and technical support to its commissioned filmmakers.

Since receiving a challenge grant from the John S. and James L. Knight Foundation in 2010, Borscht Corp. has spearheaded productions by untested moviemakers and provided a creative platform for underrepresented (often Latin American) identities in film.

== Borscht Film Festival ==
Borscht Corp. hosts a quasi-annual film festival in Miami that functions as a venue to share their work. Named one of the 25 Coolest Film Festivals in the World by MovieMaker Magazine, the Borscht Film Festival has simultaneously been hailed as "the weirdest film festival on the planet."

== Short films ==
Borscht Corporation holds open calls asking for project ideas from artists from, living in, or inspired by Miami. They seek out both first-time filmmakers from the community and invite guest filmmakers to collaborate.

Twenty short films commissioned by Borscht Corp. have screened at the Sundance Film Festival, with two of them winning Jury Prizes.

In each of the 2016 and 2018 editions of Sundance, Borscht had four projects in competition.

Fourteen Borscht Corp short films have screened at SXSW Film Festival, with three winning jury prizes.

Eight Borscht Corporation short films have screened at AFI Fest, with three winning jury prizes.

Ten Borscht Corp short films have been acquired by The Criterion Collection and are streaming on The Criterion Channel.

As of 2018, Borscht Corp shorts have collectively won fifty-one awards at film festivals.

At least twenty-one Borscht Corp commissions have been selected as Vimeo Staff Picks.

== Reception ==
Borscht Corp. productions have seen media coverage from sites, television networks, and publications as varied as Art Papers, CBS News, Interview, The New Yorker and VICE.

Their work has screened at hundreds of venues worldwide, from the Museum of Modern Art and the Guggenheim in New York City to the AFI, Rotterdam International, Sundance, SXSW, Toronto International, Tribeca, and Venice Film Festivals.

In 2015, Borscht Corp. was the subject of two retrospectives: one at the CERN in Geneva, Switzerland as part of the Cineglobe International Film Festival, and another at the Independent Filmmaker Project's Media Center in Brooklyn, New York. The Los Angeles County Museum of Art (LACMA) will host a Borscht Corp. retrospective in 2016.

Thirteen of Borscht Corp.'s core members and alumni—Bernardo Britto, Lucas Leyva, Jillian Mayer, Terence Nance, Celia Rowlson-Hall, Marnie Ellen Hertzler, Barry Jenkins, Alex Lim Haas, Robin Comisar, Sam Kuhn, Faren Humes, Keisha Rae Witherspoon and Sebastián Silva—have been named to Filmmaker Magazine's annual list of the 25 New Faces of Independent Film.

Three were named to the New York Times' list of 20 Directors to Watch in 2013—Barry Jenkins, Terence Nance, and Sebastián Silva.

== Awards ==
Borscht Corp. has received grants from the John S. and James L. Knight Foundation, Creative Capital, and Time Warner OneFifty.

Bernardo Britto's animated shorts Places Where We Lived and Yearbook were both awarded the Animated Short Grand Jury Prize at the AFI Fest in 2013 and 2014, respectively. His short film Glove received the Animated Short Grand Jury Award at the 2016 SXSW Film Festival.

Britto's animated short Yearbook received the Short Film Jury Prize at the Sundance Film Festival in 2014.

Jillian Mayer and Lucas Leyva's (collectively Mayer\Leyva) short video Scenic Jogging was selected by the Guggenheim Museums in New York, Berlin, Bilbao, and Venice to be a part of their YouTube PLAY exhibition in 2010.

Mayer\Leyva's short films Life & Freaky Times of Uncle Luke and #PostModem were finalists for the Short Film Grand Jury Prize at the 2012 and 2013 Sundance Film Festivals. In 2015, Mayer\Leyva's web series NO SEASONS—produced in association with MTV—received a Webby Award for Outstanding Reality Series.

== List of Borscht Corporation short films ==
Selected Borscht Corporation short films
Year	Title	Directors	Synopsis	Festival premiere	Notes	Refs
2010	Day N Night Out	Lucas Leyva	A young man is on the brink of spiritual and sexual self-discovery on the day his city is on the brink of destruction. The short film takes us on an odyssey through Miami on August 22, 1992, the day before Hurricane Andrew completely devastates the city.	Cannes Film Festival	Screenplay by Tarell Alvin McCraney	
2010	Velvet	Peter Glanz	Conrad loves Beatrice while Beatrice loves herself. Velvet is the story of their relationship and the crushed velvet jacket that comes between them.		Later adapted to AMC series The Trivial Pursuits of Arthur Banks	
2010	Scenic Jogging	Jillian Mayer	Jillian Mayer goes for a jog.	Guggenheim MuseumYouTube Play Bienniale		
2010	Xemoland	Daniel Cardenas	The story of a seven year-old boy who is led to believe there is a portal to an alternate reality where all his dreams come true. However, the boy quickly realizes that Xemoland is not the place of his dreams, but his nightmares.	Sundance Film Festival 2011		
2011	Otto and the Electric Eel	Duncan Skiles, Andrew Zuchero	Miami bass legend Otto Von Schirach battles to keep an inter-dimensional creature from ruining his dinner date.	New Orleans Film Festival 2011		
2011	I Am Your Grandma	Jillian Mayer	An autobiographical video diary log (vlog) that Jillian Mayer records for her unborn grandchildren.	SXSW Film Festival 2012		
2011	Reinaldo Arenas	Lucas Leyva	The true story of the last few hours in the life of an unintentional immigrant, as told by a dying shark.	Slamdance Film Festival 2012	SXSW Film Festival 2012	
2011	Chlorophyl	Barry Jenkins	Ana is a young woman struggling to get over the last vestiges of a failed relationship.	International Film Festival Rotterdam		
2011	Play Dead	The Meza Brothers	A zombie apocalypse unites a ragtag pack of dogs in the ruined streets of Miami. Immune to the epidemic, they must stick together to survive in the midst of ferocious undead and human survivors in this unauthorized sequel to Homeward Bound.	Fantasia International Film Festival		
2012	Life and Freaky Times of Uncle Luke	Jillian Mayer, Lucas Leyva	A modern Miami adaptation of the 1962 French short film La Jetee, the film recounts Uncle Luke's rise to fame as he changes the face of hip-hop and fights for first amendment rights- and later as he ushers Miami into a golden era of peace and prosperity as Mayor. Everything changes when the Turkey Point Nuclear Reactor has a meltdown.	Sundance Film Festival 2012	Sundance Film Festival 2012 Jury Prize Nominee; SXSW Film Festival 2012 Jury Prize Nominee; AFI Film Festival 2012 Jury Prize Nominee; Acquired by The Criterion Collection	
2012	Miami 1996	Nick Corirossi	A found footage film from a Miami booty party gone horribly wrong.	Online		
2012	Adventures of Christopher Bosh in the Multiverse!	Christina Felisgrau, Ronnie Rivera (Bleeding Palm)	The true story behind how the Miami Heat won the NBA title in 2012 despite one of their star players being an interstellar prince who was called away to do battle with evil foes bent on finally making the Internet completely useless.	Online		
2012	C#CKFIGHT	Julian Yuri Rodriguez	A deconstructed adaptation of Dante's Inferno that takes place at a bath salt fueled fighting ring in Miami's underworld.	Fantasia Film Festival 2013	Slamdance Film Festival 2014; San Antonio Cinefestival 2014 Jury Prize Winner; Toulouse Extreme Cinema Festival 2014 Jury Award Winner	
2012	When We Lived in Miami	Amy Seimetz	Filmed during Hurricane Isaac, When We Lived in Miami is a hypnotic short about the lengths one woman will go to keep her family from falling apart.	Vienna International Film Festival 2012	SXSW Film Festival 2013; Acquired by The Criterion Collection	
2013	The Places Where We Lived	Bernardo Britto	A man wakes up with a weird feeling. His parents are selling his childhood home.	SXSW Film Festival 2013	AFI Film Festival 2013 Jury Award Winner	
2013	To Capitalist Poem #5	Kayla Delacerda	An adaptation of Campbell McGrath's poem "Capitalist Poem #5."			
2013	Si Nos Dejan	Celia Rowlson-Hall	A love story told through bubble baths, Hollywood movies, interrupted fantasies, Mariachi songs, beachcombers, missed connections and Pamela Anderson.	SXSW Film Festival 2013		
2013	#PostModem	Jillian Mayer, Lucas Leyva	A comedic satirical sci-fi pop-musical based on the theories of Ray Kurzweil and other futurists. It's the story of two Miami girls and how they deal with the technological singularity, as told through as series of cinematic tweets.	Sundance Film Festival 2013	Sundance Film Festival 2013 Jury Prize Nominee; New York Film Festival 2013; SXSW Film Festival 2013 Jury Prize Nominee; AFI Film Festival 2013 Jury Prize Nominee	
2014	Sea Devil	Dean C. Marcial, Brett Potter	An American fisherman attempts to smuggle two Cuban immigrants into Miami, passing them off as day laborers. While the group trawls for shrimp, a fourth person boards the boat, carrying a secret at the bottom of the Ocean.	Fantasia Film Festival 2014	Fantasia Film Festival 2014 Bronze Audience Award Winner; Slamdance Film Festival 2015 Jury Prize Honorable Mention; Acquired by The Criterion Collection	
2014	The Coral Reef Are Dreaming Again	Lucas Leyva	Gregor and Harold, two corals living in the underwater remains of Miami, share their dreams with each other.		with Coral Morphologic	
2014	The Voice Thief	Adan Jodorowsky	A man goes on a surreal odyssey through Miami's psychedelic underworld in search of his wife's missing voice.	l'Etrange Festival Paris 2014	l'Etrange Festival Paris 2014 Jury and Audience Award Winner; Fantastic Fest 2014 Award Winner; Lausanne Underground Film and Music Festival 2014 Award Winner; Rotterdam International Film Festival 2014; Acquired by The Criterion Collection	
2014	Yearbook	Bernardo Britto	A man is hired to compile the definitive history of human existence before the planet blows up.	Sundance Film Festival 2014	Sundance Film Festival 2014 Jury Prize Winner; AFI Film Festival 2014 Jury Award Winner; Florida Film Festival, 2014 Jury Award Winner; Eastern Oregon Film Festival 2014 Jury Award Winner; Ashland Film Festival 2014 Jury Award Winner; Nantucket Film Festival 2014 Jury Prize Winner; Acquired by The Criterion Collection	
2015	Papa Machete	Jonathan David Kane	200 years ago, the slaves of Haiti defeated Napoleon's armies in the historic revolution of 1791-1804. One of their weapons was the very tool they used to work the land: the machete. Papa Machete explores the esoteric martial art that evolved through this victory through the practice and life of a farmer named Alfred Avril. The short film documents his proud devotion to his heritage in the face of bitter poverty, and his efforts to keep this mysterious art alive.	Sundance Film Festival 2015	Toronto International Film Festival 2015; Zanzibar International Film Festival 2015 Award Winner; Trinidad and Tobago Film Festival, 2015 Award Winner	
2015	The Sun Like a Big Dark Animal	Christina Felisgrau, Ronnie Rivera (Bleeding Palm)	A computer and a woman fall in love only to be torn apart because of their inappropriate feelings for each other.	Sundance Film Festival 2015	New Orleans Film Festival 2015 Jury Award Winner; AFI Fest 2015	
2015	All Your Favorite Shows!	Danny Madden	Shows and commercials and videos and more shows. That's all this kid sees and that's all he cares to see.	SXSW Film Festival 2015	Futureshorts 2015 Audience Award Winner; ARS Film Festival Audience Award Winner	
2015	Diamond Princess En Plein Aire	Jacolby Satterwhite	Scored by Patricia Satterwhite's drawings and Miami rapper Trina's iconic Diamond Princess album, the piece uses the hyperbolic language and imagery from both sources to construct a hedonistic, performative and queer utopic narrative.	Perez Art Museum Miami 2015		
2015	Biscayne World	Marnie Ellen Hertzler, Michael Arcos	An animation based on the insane everyday interactions on Biscayne Boulevard, as seen through the ubiquitous, iconic graffiti eyeballs of street artist Ahol Sniffs Glue.	Glasgow Film Festival 2015		
2016	Swimming in Your Skin Again	Terence Nance	A film about motherhood, banality, Miami, the water, the divine feminine, and how to sing in church in a way that calls forth your own adulthood.	Sundance Film Festival 2016	Rotterdam International Film Festival 2016; AFI Film Festival 2016; Acquired by The Criterion Collection	
2016	Boniato	Eric Mainade, The Meza Brothers	An illegal migrant worker decides it's time to move on from picking crops and find her father. Little does she know, insidious supernatural forces have a different plan for her.	Sundance Film Festival 2016		
2016	Dolfun	Sebastián Silva	What begins as a love story becomes an existential crisis when filmmaker Sebastián Silva flies to Miami to fulfill his lifelong dream of swimming with a dolphin.	Sundance Film Festival 2016		
2016	Glove	Alexa Lim Haas, Bernardo Britto	The true story of a glove that's been floating in space forever since 1968.	Sundance Film Festival 2016	SXSW Film Festival 2016 Jury Prize Winner; San Francisco Film Festival 2016 Jury Prize Winner; Palm Springs Film Festival 2016 Jury Prize Winner; Provincetown Film Festival 2016 Jury Prize Winner; Milan Film Festival 2016 Jury Prize Winner	
2017	The Sky Is a Gap	Rachel Rossin	An immersive Virtual Reality Installation that uses motion capture and spatial-mapping to allow users to move time forwards and back.	Sundance Film Festival 2017	Virtual Reality	
2017	Kaiju Bunraku	Jillian Mayer, Lucas Leyva	A day in the life of a Husband and a Wife, living in a world of giant monsters.	Sundance Film Festival 2017	Fantastic Fest 2017 Jury Prize Winner; Acquired by The Criterion Collection	
2017	Möbius	Sam Kuhn	A tale of magic and mutation half remembered by a teen poet whose beloved has mysteriously disappeared.	Cannes Film Festival 2017	Cannes Semaine de la Critique Queer Palm D'or Nominee; Dallas International Film Festival 2017 Jury Prize Winner; Acquired by The Criterion Collection	
2017	Lance Lizardi	Xander Robin	A young man takes his love for lizards to the extreme.	AFI Fest 2017		
2017	Growing Girl	Marnie Ellen Hertzler	A PowerPoint presentation about snakes and all of the things I wish I would have done.	Maryland Film Festival 2017	Ann Arbor Film Festival Jury Prize Winner; Indie Grits Film Festival Jury Prize Winner	
2018	GREAT CHOICE	Robin Comisar	A woman gets stuck in a Red Lobster commercial.	Sundance Film Festival 2018	Toronto International Film Festival 2017; Rotterdam International Film Festival 2018; AFI Fest 2018; Champs-Élysées Film Festival 2018; Fantastic Fest 2018	
2018	Mud	Shandiin Tome	On her last day, Ruby faces the inescapable remnants of alcoholism, family, and culture.	Sundance Film Festival 2018		
2018	Agua Viva	Alexa Lim Haas	A Chinese manicurist in Miami attempts to describe feelings she doesn't have the words for.	Sundance Film Festival 2018	SXSW Film Festival 2018 Jury Prize Winner; Rotterdam Film Festival 2018; Champs-Élysées Film Festival 2018	
2018	PLUR	Julie Fliegenspan	A claymation adaptation of a series of actual voicemails received after making out with someone at a rave.	Sundance Film Festival 2018		
2019	Liberty	Faren Humes	As the Liberty Square Housing Projects are redeveloped, Liberty and Sheatopia deal with a shifting friendship after one of them wins the coveted title of Ms. Pork N Beans in a dance contest.	Berlin International Film Festival 2019	Berlin Film Festival 2019 Best Short Winner; AFI Fest Grand Jury Prize Special Mention; Champs-Élysées Film Festival 2019 Jury Prize Winner; SXSW Film Festival 2019 Jury Prize Winner	
2019	Gepetto	Z Behl	A re-imagining of Pinocchio in the style of a deconstructed spaghetti western.			
2019	Dirt Daughter	Marnie Ellen Hertzler	A lonely security guard dreams of finding a companion on farmersonly.com.		Acquired by The Criterion Collection	
2020	T	Keisha Rae Witherspoon	Set decades in the future, T follows three participants in the 50th Annual T Ball, in which community members of Liberty City assemble to model wildly innovative "R.I.P." T-shirts designed to honor their deceased loved ones.	Sundance Film Festival 2020	Berlin Film Festival 2020 Best Short Winner; Blackstar Film Festival 2020 Audience Award; New Orleans Film Festival 2020 Audience Award; Acquired by The Criterion Collection	
2020	Valerio's Day Out	Michael Arcos	A young jaguar goes on a killing spree when he escapes from his enclosure at a zoo. After he's captured, sedated, and relocated, he makes a video diary for his significant other, Lula.	Sundance Film Festival 2020	Sundance Film Festival 2020 Jury Award Winner; Overlook Film Festival 2020 Jury Award Winner; Fantastic Fest 2020 Award Winner; New Orleans Film Festival 2020 Award Winner	
2020	Mingus's The Clown	Trevor Bazile	A musical adaptation of Charles Mingus's composition which tells the story of a clown who tries to please The People, but only succeeds in ending his life.			
