= Alligator Jesus =

American jeweler and artist

- Born: David Josef Tamargo; Miami, Florida, U.S.
- Education: Florida International University
- Occupations: Jeweler, metalsmith, designer, artist
- Known for: Custom grillz; wearable art

Alligator Jesus (born David Josef Tamargo) is an American jeweler, metalsmith, designer and artist known for custom grillz and sculptural jewelry. Raised in Miami, Florida, he worked in photography and live performance before moving to Los Angeles in 2012. His commissions have included pieces for Lil Nas X and Doechii. A diamond grill he made for Bad Bunny was exhibited at the American Museum of Natural History in 2024 as part of Ice Cold: An Exploration of Hip-Hop Jewelry.

== Early life and education ==
Tamargo grew up in Miami, Florida, in a Cuban-American family. He became interested in photography growing up, and studied traditional darkroom printing. Later, he developed an allergy to the chemicals used in photographic processing. A professor suggested he try working with silver as a metal instead of as a photographic chemical.

At Florida International University, he studied sculpture, metalsmithing and jewelry-making. Among his early pieces were castings made from impressions of human body parts including genitals, using molding techniques he later applied to jewelry.

== Career ==
=== Miami art and music scene ===
During the 2000s, Tamargo worked in Miami as a photographer and performance artist and became involved with the Borscht Film Festival. He appeared onstage with Miami electronic musician Otto von Schirach, sometimes handling oversized theatrical props.

In a 2020 interview, Tamargo said he adopted the name Alligator Jesus in 2008 after breaking his wrist during an encounter with an alligator in the Everglades. He described the encounter as part of a performance-art project involving physical challenges.

=== Murakami ring and move to Los Angeles ===
In 2011, Tamargo spotted a ring by Japanese artist Takashi Murakami in a Miami Beach pawn shop. The ring had been stolen at an earlier art fair. Tamargo bought it and contacted the artist's representatives, leading to a police investigation and an arrest.

After visiting Los Angeles in 2011, Tamargo relocated there in January 2012. He has said he met Murakami in person in 2013 and that the artist encouraged him to concentrate on jewelry-making. He formally established Alligator Jesus as a jewelry business in 2013.

=== Jewelry and design work ===
At his workshop in Downtown Los Angeles, he designs and manufactures custom fitted grillz and sets precious metals with diamonds and other gemstones. He also produces rings, pendants and other designs. The Alligator Jesus showroom also displays his work alongside clothing and accessories by other designers he curates. His custom grillz have been discussed in GQ's 2023 survey of contemporary men's jewelry. In a 2025 profile, Narcissist Magazine described Alligator Jesus as the "King of Grillz".

Alligator Jesus has made jewelry for Lil Nas X's 2021 single Montero (Call Me by Your Name), including pieces used in the cover artwork. That year, he also made a diamond-and-opal grill and matching diamond-studded manicure for the singer. At the 2022 MTV Video Music Awards, Doechii wore black grillz made by Alligator Jesus. In 2023, he designed a 14-karat white-gold grill set with diamonds and rhodium plating for Bad Bunny. It was displayed the following year in the American Museum of Natural History's exhibition Ice Cold: An Exploration of Hip-Hop Jewelry.

At Lil Nas X's request, Alligator Jesus supplied diamond grillz for the singer's wax figure unveiled at Madame Tussauds London in 2023. In interviews, Alligator Jesus has named Ozzy Osbourne, Billie Joe Armstrong and Ghostemane among his clients. His work has also extended to clothing: in 2025 he collaborated with Ukrainian lingerie label ZHILYOVA on a limited-edition collection.

== See also ==
- Grill (jewelry)
- Hip-hop jewelry
