= Ping-pong (disambiguation) =

Ping-pong, or table tennis, is a sport where players hit a lightweight ball back and forth across a table.

Ping-Pong, Ping Pong, or Pingpong may also refer to:

== Diplomatic and legislative affairs ==
- Parliamentary ping-pong, a term for when legislation is passed back and forth between two house of parliament
- Ping-pong diplomacy, exchange of ping pong players between the U.S. and China which paved the way for President Richard Nixon's visit to Beijing in 1972

== Mathematics, science and technology ==
- Ping-pong lemma, any of several mathematical statements for proving that some elements in a group acting on a set freely generate a free subgroup of that group
- Ping-pong mechanism, a type of biochemical reaction characterized by its enzyme kinetics
- Ping-pong scheme, a programming algorithm
- Ping-Pong virus, a computer virus

== Media and arts ==
=== Films ===
- Ping Pong (1986 film), a British film
- Ping Pong (2002 film), a Japanese manga-adaptation film
- Ping Pong (2012 film), a British documentary, directed by Hugh Hartford
- Ping Pong Playa, a 2007 film directed by Jessica Yu

=== Recording ===
- Ping-pong recording, a production technique using multiple tape decks

==== Vocalists, groups and labels ====
- PingPong (band), an Israeli band
- Ping Pong (singer), a Surinamese singer
- Pigeons Playing Ping Pong, an American funk-jam band

==== Albums and EPs ====
- Ping Pong (Momus album), 1997
- Ping Pong (Jacuzzi Boys album), 2016
- Ping Pong, a 1996 album by Ib Glindemann
- Ping Pong (EP), a 1994 EP by Stereolab
- The Ping Pong EP, a 2000 EP by SNFU

==== Songs ====
- "Ping Pong" (Armin van Buuren song)
- "Ping Pong" (Hyuna and Dawn song)
- "Do You Know? (The Ping Pong Song)", a 2007 song by Enrique Iglesias
- "Ping Pong", a song by Stereolab from the album Mars Audiac Quintet
- "Ping Pong", a song by I.O.I from the 2016 EP Miss Me?

=== Other arts, entertainment, and media ===
- Ping Pong (manga), a Japanese manga series by Taiyō Matsumoto
- Ping Pong (TV series), a 2021 Chinese TV series
- Ping Pong, a character from the animated TV series Camp Lazlo
- Ping-Pong Club, a Japanese manga by Minoru Furuya
- Ping pong show, a sex tourism show prevalent in Thailand
- Konami's Ping Pong, a 1985 video game from Konami

== See also ==
- Bing Bong (disambiguation)
- Ping (disambiguation)
- Pong (disambiguation)
