= Lost Zombies =

Social network

Lost Zombies was a zombie-themed social network with the goal of creating a community-generated zombie documentary. The website, built on the Ning platform, launched on May 1, 2008, and was created by Ryan Leach, Skot Leach and Rob Oshima.

== Overview ==
Lost Zombies followed a fictional timeline which begins in February 2007 with an influenza epidemic. The flu virus mutates out of control, eventually causing Zombism. The timeline leads to the present day where 75% of the world's population is dead or undead. Users were able to create a profile on the Lost Zombies website and submit videos, audio, pictures and written accounts that reflect some portion of the Lost Zombies timeline. The creators of Lost Zombies intended to compile the user submissions into a single, cohesive, mock documentary.

== Closure ==
The Lost Zombies website shut down on March 22, 2014, due to the creators abandoning the project for other ones and leaving the community to dwindle.

== Awards ==
Lost Zombies received the Best Community Website Award and the People's Choice Award at the 2009 SXSW Web Awards held on March 15, 2009.

Lost Zombies was featured as one of the 25 new faces of independent film by FilmMaker Magazine.
