= Nira Burstein =

American filmmaker

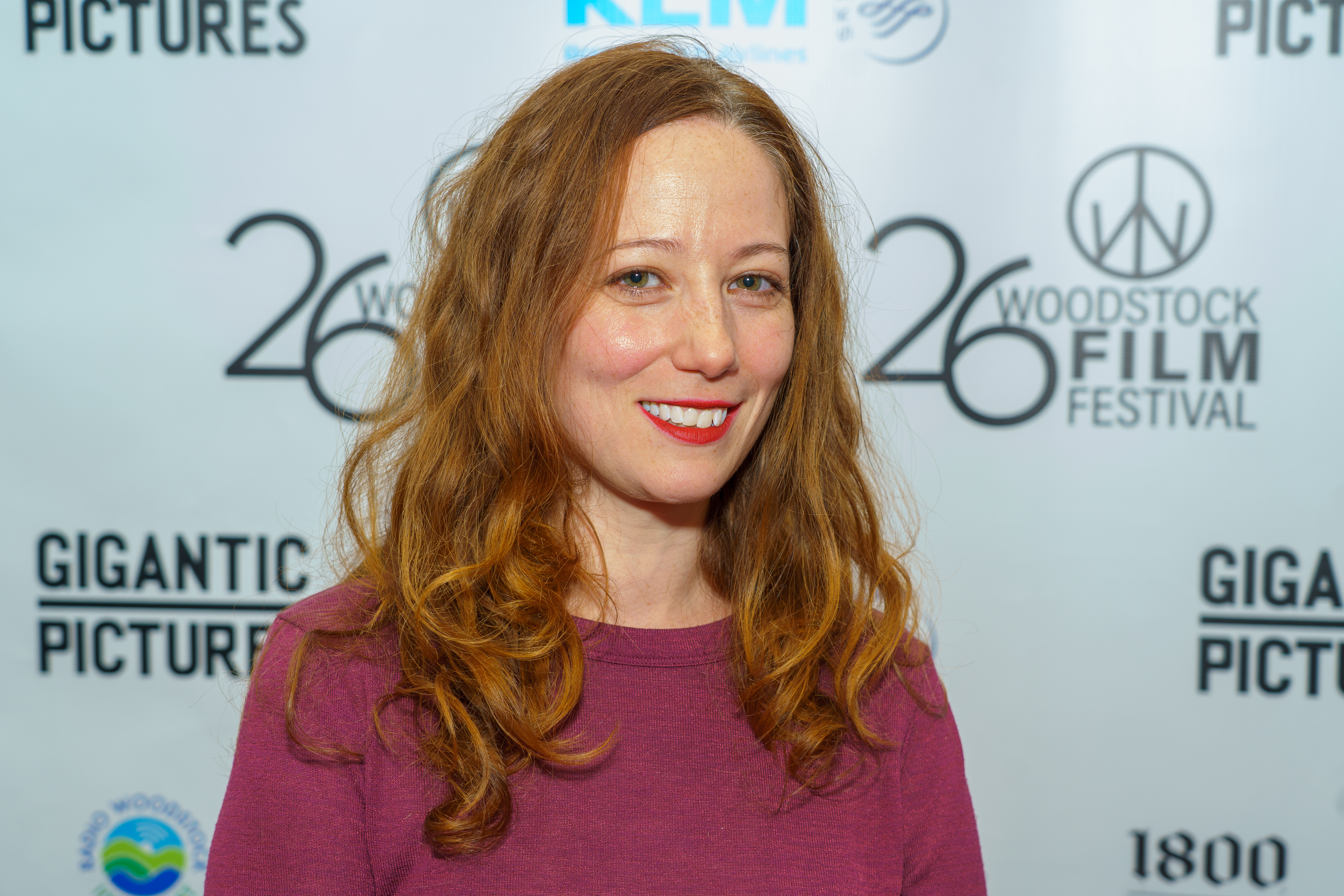
- Burstein at the 26th Annual Woodstock Film Festival
- Born: U.S.
- Occupations: Director, writer, editor, producer
- Years active: 2011–present

Nira Burstein is an American filmmaker based in New York City. She is known for her documentary film Charm Circle. In 2021, Filmmaker magazine named her one of the "25 New Faces of Independent Film".

== Career ==
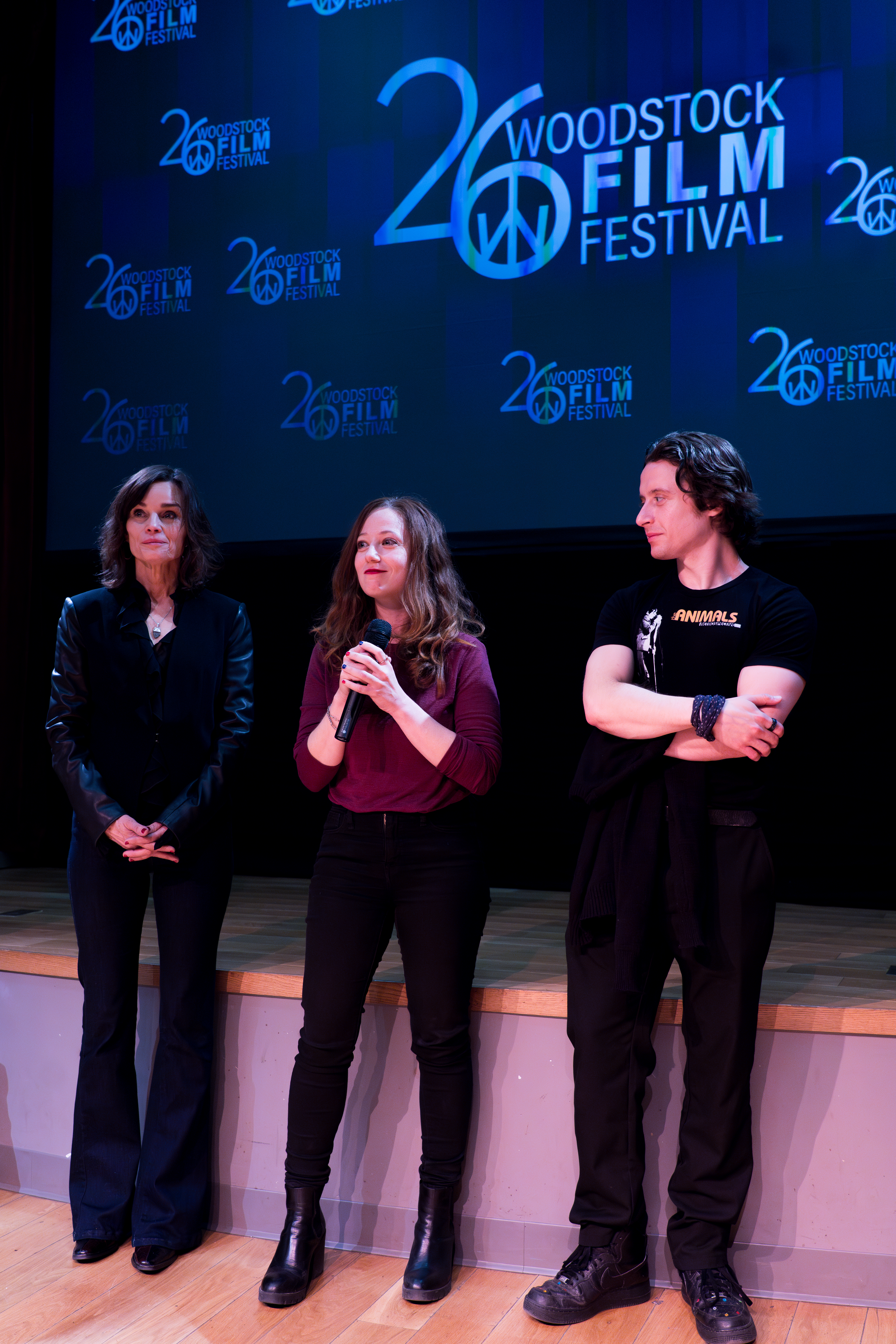
Cast and Writer/Director Burstein of "Dear Shop Girl" during a Q & A at the 2025 Woodstock Film Festival

Burstein graduated from Queens College, City University of New York. In 2014, her short film Off & Away, premiered at the Brooklyn Film Festival. In 2020, her short film Gangrenous, premiered at the Nantucket Film Festival. In 2021, she directed her debut feature documentary Charm Circle, which premiered at the Sheffield Doc/Fest. In 2025, her short film Dear Shop Girl, premiered at the Woodstock Film Festival

== Filmography ==
Year	Title	Contribution	Note
2011	The Light House	Director and writer	Short film
2012	I Said Light	Director, writer, editor and producer	Short film
2014	Lucky Day	Editor	Short film
2014	Off & Away	Director, writer, editor and producer	Short film
2020	Gangrenous	Director, writer and editor	Short film
2021	Charm Circle	Director, writer, editor, cinematographer and producer	Documentary
2025	Dear Shop Girl	Director, writer	Short film

== Awards and nominations ==
Year	Result	Award	Category	Work	Ref.
2021	Won	Sheffield Doc/Fest	Audience Award	Charm Circle	
2021	Won	Sheffield Doc/Fest	First Feature Award Special Mention	Charm Circle	
2021	Won	DOC NYC	Special Jury Recognition	Charm Circle	
2021	Nominated	International Documentary Association	Best Editing	Charm Circle	
