= Strangers (2017 TV series) =

American comedy-drama web television series

- Genre: Comedy drama
- Created by: Mia Lidofsky
- Starring: Zoë Chao; Meredith Hagner
- Country of origin: United States
- Original language: English
- No. of seasons: 2
- No. of episodes: 17

Production
- Executive producers: Jesse Peretz; Mia Lidofsky; Michael B. Clark; Alex Turtletaub; Amy Emmerich; Shannon Gibson; Stone Roberts; M. Blair Brown; Neena Beber
- Producers: Sara Murphy; Jason Baum; David Bausch; Ryan Cunningham
- Cinematography: Hillary Spera; Anne Etheridge
- Camera setup: Single-camera
- Running time: 12–27 minutes
- Production companies: Beachside Productions; Refinery29; Air Mia Pictures

Original release
- Network: Facebook Watch
- Release: September 4, 2017 – August 26, 2018

Strangers is an American comedy-drama web series created by Mia Lidofsky that premiered on September 4, 2017, on Facebook Watch. The series stars Zoë Chao and Meredith Hagner and is executive produced by Lidofsky, Jesse Peretz, Michael B. Clark, Alex Turtletaub, M. Blair Brown, and Neena Beber.

== Premise ==
The first season follows "Isobel, a young woman living in Los Angeles who rents out her extra room on Airbnb. She finds herself in need of extra cash after boyfriend moves out when she cheats on him with a woman. As she struggles to make sense of her shifting sexuality, an eccentric cast of characters rotate through her house, bringing both inconveniences and unexpected wisdom."

The second season follows Isobel as she "switches from host to renter when she moves across the country with her best friend, Cam. On the cusp of 30 and now living in NYC, it's Isobel's year to explore the many different paths to adulthood, starting with a new neighborhood each episode. As a woman living fully in the bi-sphere (bisexual, biracial, and now bi-coastal), Isobel is saying yes to life and asking the most difficult question: where do you belong when you’re in between everything?"

== Cast and characters ==
=== Main ===
- Zoë Chao as Isobel Song
- Meredith Hagner as Cam

=== Recurring ===
- Isabelle McNally as Hailey
- Langston Kerman as Jake
- Morgan Krantz as Ezra
- X Mayo as Robbie
- Kyle Allen as Milo
- Kathleen Munroe as Mari
- Ciara Renée as Sasha
- Stephanie DiMaggio as Stephania, the manager of Le Playground.
- Sarita Choudhury as Brooke
- Raviv Ullman as Royce
- Sue Jean Kim as Elody Wu
- Maureen Sebastian as Stella
- Tara Summers as Andy
- Hans Tester as Henry
- Sydney Mae Diaz as River
- Maria Dizzia as Georgie
- Stephen McKinley Henderson as Billy
- Edward Akrout as Mateo

=== Guest ===
- Ebon Moss-Bachrach as the voice of Dad ("Honeymooners")
- Gaby Hoffmann as the voice of Mom ("Honeymooners")
- Jemaine Clement as Oliver ("Honeymooners")
- Matt Oberg as Dave ("Tinder Hearts")
- Shiri Appleby as Minister/Julie ("Water Into Wine")
- Eka Darville as Markquon ("Water Into Wine")
- Jemima Kirke as Emmy ("Homeless")
- Bridget Regan as Ana ("Homeless")
- Holden McNeil as Charlie ("Homeless")
- Sophia Anne Caruso as Lily ("The Big (Gr)apple")
- Michael Cavadias as Joakeem ("The Big (Gr)apple")
- Mahi Alam as Samir ("Maskulinity")
- Samrat Chakrabarti as Jai ("Maskulinity")
- Madhur Jaffrey as Nani ("Maskulinity")
- Trieste Kelly Dunn as Elliot ("Big Little Chill")
- Rebecca Naomi Jones as Eliza ("Big Little Chill")
- Dolly Wells as Tasha ("Big Little Chill")
- Talia Balsam as Isobel's Mother ("Smash the Plate-triarchy")
- Rain Dove as Elly ("Spun and Done")

== Episodes ==
Season	Episodes	Originally released	
Season	Episodes	First released	Last released
1	7	September 4, 2017	October 9, 2017
2	10	June 24, 2018	August 26, 2018

=== Season 1 (2017) ===
No. overall	No. in season	Title	Directed by	Written by	Original release date
1	1	"Honeymooners"	Mia Lidofsky	Mia Lidofsky, Chad Hartigan, & Zoë Chao	September 4, 2017
2	2	"Tinder Hearts"	Mia Lidofsky	Mia Lidofsky & Jim Strouse	September 4, 2017
3	3	"Water Into Wine"	Mia Lidofsky & Celia Rowlson-Hall	Mia Lidofsky & Jim Strouse	September 11, 2017
4	4	"Couples Counseling"	Mia Lidofsky	Mia Lidofsky & Jim Strouse	September 18, 2017
5	5	"Hot Set"	Celia Rowlson-Hall	Mia Lidofsky & Jim Strouse	September 25, 2017
6	6	"Getaway"	Mia Lidofsky	Mia Lidofsky & Jim Strouse	October 2, 2017
7	7	"Homeless"	Mia Lidofsky	Mia Lidofsky & Jim Strouse	October 9, 2017

=== Season 2 (2018) ===
No. overall	No. in season	Title	Directed by	Written by	Original release date
8	1	"The Big (Gr)apple"	Mia Lidofsky	Emma Fletcher	June 24, 2018
9	2	"Open Mari(age)"	Neena Beber & Mia Lidofsky	Mia Lidofsky	July 1, 2018
10	3	"Maskulinity"	Darnell Martin	Sonia Denis	July 8, 2018
11	4	"The Disappearance of Katia Romaine"	Celia Rowlson-Hall	Emma Fletcher	July 15, 2018
12	5	"Big Little Chill"	Celia Rowlson-Hall	Hannah Bos & Paul Thureen	July 22, 2018
13	6	"Smash the Plate-triarchy"	Jesse Peretz	Jenny Zhang	July 29, 2018
14	7	"West Side Highway"	Mia Lidofsky	Hannah Bos & Paul Thureen	August 5, 2018
15	8	"First Skate"	Darnell Martin	Brittani Nichols	August 12, 2018
16	9	"Spun and Done"	Jesse Peretz	Neena Beber	August 19, 2018
17	10	"The Impossibility of Forever?"	Mia Lidofsky	Story by : Mia Lidofsky & Katie O'Hanlon; Teleplay by : Katie O'Hanlon	August 26, 2018

== Production ==
=== Development ===
On May 2, 2016, Refinery29 announced during its Digital Content NewFronts presentation that they were producing the series in association with Beachside Productions. The series was expected to be written and directed by Mia Lidofsky and executive produced by Jesse Peretz.

Following the series debut at the Sundance Film Festival in January 2017, Lidofsky continued to try and figure out how to get the show launched and distributed. That spring, Facebook became aware of the series and soon acquired its already produced first season. On June 26, 2017, it was announced that the series had been acquired by Facebook Watch and that it would premiere with the launch of the service in late 2017.

On October 17, 2017, it was reported that Facebook had renewed the series for a second season consisting of ten episodes to premiere in 2018. The runtime of each episode was expected to expand from 15 minutes in length to a more standard TV half-hour (between 20 minutes and 25 minutes).

=== Filming ===
Principal photography for season two of the series was expected to begin in late March 2018.

== Release ==
=== Marketing ===
On January 20, 2017, a trailer for the first season was released.

=== Premiere ===
On January 22, 2017, the series premiered its first three episodes at the annual Sundance Film Festival in Park City, Utah. On July 15, 2017, the series held its official west coast premiere at Outfest in Los Angeles, California where the entire series was screened as part of the film festival's centerpiece screening series.

On June 26, 2018, the series held its second season premiere at The William Vale hotel in New York City, New York. On July 19, 2018, the west coast premiere of the second season is scheduled to be held during Outfest in Los Angeles, California. The first two episodes of season two are set to be screened and will be followed with a question-and-answer session with the cast and crew.

== Reception ==
Strangers has been met with a positive reception from critics upon its release. Mashable critic Laura Prudom claimed that "if you haven't discovered Strangers yet, you're in for a treat." The Knockturnal critic Ivan De Luce praised the show for exploring sexuality in a "fresh way" and that "Unlike other shows about youth, Strangers steers clear of characters who mope about the pointlessness of life, and instead focuses on the positive, namely the many relationships that help us through life’s struggles. As a result, Strangers exudes warmth."

== See also ==
- List of original programs distributed by Facebook Watch
