= Ornana =

American film company

Ornana (also called Ornana Films) is an American film company founded by director Danny Madden. Ornana's short film, "(notes on) biology", was nominated for the Best Animated Short Subject Award at the 39th Annie Awards and won the Jury Prize for Short Animation at South by Southwest in 2012. They have since released a feature film, "euphonia", for free on vimeo.com. They were listed by Filmmaker Magazine as one of the 25 New Faces of Independent Film in 2012 Filmmaker (magazine)#2012.
