= Mia Lidofsky =

American filmmaker and television producer

- Born: United States
- Education: Bates College
- Occupations: Director; writer; producer; showrunner
- Years active: 2013–present
- Notable work: Strangers
- Spouse: Celia Rowlson-Hall
- Website: mialidofsky.com

Mia Lidofsky is an American director, writer, and producer best known as the creator, writer, director, and executive producer of the Facebook Watch comedy-drama series Strangers. She has also worked as a commercial and music-video director and has credits on television series including Girls and Nurse Jackie.

== Early life and education ==
Lidofsky attended Bates College, where she played goalkeeper for the Bates Bobcats women's soccer team, wearing jersey No. 1, and suffered a season-ending injury in the team's 2005 season opener against Saint Joseph's College. She graduated with the class of 2009.

== Career ==
=== Early career ===
Lidofsky began her career working for director Jesse Peretz, an experience she has described as "my film school." She went on to work as a producer and development executive for Beachside Films, during which time she also directed music videos. In 2015, she served as associate producer on the documentary Tig and the narrative feature People Places Things, both of which premiered at the 2015 Sundance Film Festival. She also held additional crew credits on the HBO series Girls and the Showtime series Nurse Jackie. It was on the set of Girls that Lidofsky first met choreographer Celia Rowlson-Hall, whom she would later marry.

That same year, Lidofsky was selected for the AFI Directing Workshop for Women, through which she wrote and directed the pilot episode of what would become Strangers.

=== Strangers (2017–2018) ===
Lidofsky created, wrote, and directed Strangers, a comedy-drama produced in partnership with Refinery29 and Beachside Films. The series follows Isobel Song, a bisexual, biracial writer played by Zoë Chao, whose life is upended after her boyfriend discovers she has cheated with a woman and moves out. Unable to cover the rent alone, Isobel begins renting out the spare room of her Los Angeles home through Airbnb. In the second season, Isobel relocates to New York City with her best friend Cam, switching from Airbnb host to renter as she navigates the city.

Lidofsky has said the series was inspired by her own experience renting out her New York apartment on Airbnb for several years while working in Los Angeles. The character of Cam, Isobel's best friend, was loosely based on Lidofsky's real-life friendship with Chao, whom she has known since they met on their first day of nursery school in 1989.

Strangers premiered at the 2017 Sundance Film Festival and was the U.S. Centerpiece Film at Outfest 2017 before being acquired by Facebook Watch for its first season. Facebook Watch subsequently greenlit a second season, for which Lidofsky stepped into the role of showrunner, co-ran the writers' room, and directed four episodes. The series received critical praise, with Vice calling it "the best queer comedy on TV right now" and Vulture describing it as "a big hearted drama."

=== Political and commercial work ===
Lidofsky co-directed the viral video #PantsuitPower, made in support of Hillary Clinton's 2016 presidential campaign, with Rowlson-Hall; the video garnered more than five million views within two weeks. In 2018, the pair followed up with a #BeMyVoice video ahead of the midterm elections, which was shared by media outlets including Good Morning America, CNN, and NowThis.

Lidofsky has directed commercials for brands including Spotify, as well as music videos for artists such as Emmy the Great, MOTHXR, and Genevieve. In 2024, she signed with production company m ss ng p eces for representation on special commercial projects. As of the mid-2020s, she has been developing a new television series as well as her feature-film directorial debut, and is represented by UTA.

== Personal life ==
Lidofsky is openly gay. She married filmmaker and choreographer Celia Rowlson-Hall on September 8, 2018, in a beach ceremony on Long Island's North Fork, which was featured in Vogue. The couple, who met on the set of Girls, have a son, Romeo, born around 2023.

== Recognition ==
In 2018, Lidofsky was named to Out magazine's Out100 list, which recognizes influential LGBTQ people of the year.

== Filmography ==
Year	Title	Role	Notes
2013–2014	Girls	Additional crew	Television series, 8 episodes
2015	Tig	Associate producer	Documentary film
2015	People Places Things	Associate producer	Feature film
2016	People Places Things: In the Details	Director	Short/promotional video
2017–2018	Strangers	Creator, writer, director, executive producer	Facebook Watch series, 2 seasons
