= Leah Shore =

American film director

Leah Shore is a Brooklyn, NY based artist, animator, and film director best known for her short films: 2010 Sundance Film Festival selection Meatwaffle, 2011 and 2013 SXSW selections BOOBatary and Old Man, and 2014 Slamdance Film Festival selection I Love You So Much.

== Biography ==
Shore grew up in Philadelphia, Pennsylvania, and attended RISD college in Providence, Rhode Island, graduating in 2009. Her thesis film, Meatwaffle, which animation historian Jerry Beck called "either genius or nonsense," and Sundance deemed "wonderfully bizarre" was selected for the 2010 Sundance Film Festival, where Shore was only woman and youngest participant selected for the Animation Showcase. Meatwaffle went on to play at SXSW and more than fifty other film festivals.

== Work and style ==
As an animator, Shore has been mentioned in a sentence with Bill Plympton, and is known for a bold, colorful style described as "extreme, and often humorous," and "raunchy and bizarre" that frequently depicts pop culture or well-known subjects. She typically writes, animates, directs, and produces her own work. Shore cited Ralph Steadman, Eric Fishl, Jan Svankmajer, Salvador Dalí, Tom Waits, Matthew Barney, Patti Smith, and Robert Mapplethorpe as influences in a 2010 interview with Channel Frederator.

Shore is a prolific creator of short-form content, directing animated spots for Cartoon Network, Google, MTV, and collaborating on music videos for notable recording artists like Ke$ha. Shore is known to work on a fast schedule; many of her spots commissioned for VICE and MTV are completed in under 5 days. She was named in 2013 Filmmaker Magazine's 25 New Faces of Independent Film. Mountain Dew's online magazine Green Label named Shore one of "10 Animators You Need to Know" alongside Cartoon Network showrunners Pendleton Ward and Rebecca Sugar. In 2013, Meatwaffle was inducted into the Sundance Permanent Collection at the UCLA Film and Television Archive.

According to Shore's Tumblr page, her first fully live-action short, Hallway, filmed "in a real secret sex club in NYC", should debut in 2015.

=== Old Man ===
Old Man, Shore's third film, is an experimental documentary short animated to never-before-heard telephone calls between Charles Manson and Canadian author Marlin Marynick, recorded as reference for a biography by Marynick. Beginning pre-production as early as February 2010, Shore edited the 10 hours of phone calls—originally captured through a smuggled prison cell-phone—into a 5-minute audio track, then spent over 2 years animating the film. Selected for over fifty festivals worldwide, Old Man opened the prestigious Gen Art festival in New York City in August 2012, and competed in the Animation category at the 2013 SXSW Film Festival.

=== I Love You So Much ===
I Love You So Much debuted at the 2014 Slamdance Film Festival and played at the Los Angeles Film Festival and continues to play at festivals today. Shore's first time mixing animation with live action, the film, about "the muck of romantic language," was a Vimeo staff pick in December, 2014 and has been viewed over eighty thousand times. Most recently it was shown as a part of "Vimeo Staff Picks Cinema: Directors Commentary" at the SXSW 2015 Film Festival. Shore was one of five directors to show.

== Filmography ==
Title	Year	Medium	Format	Role
Meatwaffle	2009	2D/Stop Motion Animation/Mixed Media	Short Film	Director, writer, editor, animator
Boobatary	2011	2D Animation	Short Film	Director, writer, editor, animator
Old Man	2012	2D Animation/Stop Motion Animation/Computer Animation/Mixed Media	Short Film	Director, writer, editor, animator
I Love You So Much	2014	Live Action/2D Animation	Short Film	Director, writer, animator, Storyboard, Art Direction
Hallway	2015	Live Action	Short Film	Director, writer, Storyboard, Art Direction
