= Omniboat: A Fast Boat Fantasia =

2020 American anthology film by the Borscht Corporation

- Directed by: Daniels; Hannah Fidell; Alexa Lim Haas; Lucas Leyva; Olivia Lloyd; Jillian Mayer; The Meza Brothers; Terence Nance; Brett Potter; Dylan Redford; Xander Robin; Julian Yuri Rodriguez; Celia Rowlson-Hall
- Screenplay by: Daniels; Hannah Fidell; Alexa Lim Haas; Lucas Leyva; Olivia Lloyd; Phil Lord; Jillian Mayer; The Meza Brothers; Terence Nance; Brett Potter; Dylan Redford; Xander Robin; Julian Yuri Rodriguez; Celia Rowlson-Hall
- Based on: A PDF by Lucas Leyva
- Produced by: Olivia Lloyd; Matthew Perniciaro; Michael Sherman; Taylor Shung
- Starring: Gbenga Akinnagbe; River Butcher; Adam DeVine; Cameron Esposito; Jason David Frank; Jon Glaser; Uncle Luke; Wayne LeGette; Doug Lussenhop; Jillian Mayer; Adam Pally; Robert Redford; Mel Rodriguez; Amy Seimetz; Jessica Williams; Saul Williams; Casey Wilson; Finn Wolfhard
- Cinematography: Ian S. Takahashi
- Edited by: Matthew C. Levy
- Music by: Adam Rohl; Shawn Sutta
- Production companies: Borscht Corporation; Bow and Arrow Entertainment
- Release date: January 26, 2020 (Sundance)
- Running time: 117 minutes
- Country: United States
- Languages: English; Spanish

Omniboat: A Fast Boat Fantasia is a 2020 American anthology film written and directed by the Daniels, Hannah Fidell, Alexa Lim Haas, Lucas Leyva, Olivia Lloyd, Phil Lord, Jillian Mayer, The Meza Brothers, Terence Nance, Brett Potter, Dylan Redford, Xander Robin, Julian Yuri Rodriguez, and Celia Rowlson-Hall. The film is made up of several different stories chronicling the life of Lay'n Pipe, a 47 foot (14 m) TopGun Cigarette boat, from its conception through the end of human civilization. It was Robert Redford's final film role before his death in 2025.

Omniboat: A Fast Boat Fantasia premiered on January 26, 2020 at the 2020 Sundance Film Festival as part of the NEXT category. The film received mixed reviews, though critics praised the film's originality.

== Cast ==
- Gbenga Akinnagbe
- River Butcher
- Houston Cypress
- Adam DeVine
- Cameron Esposito
- Jason David Frank
- Jon Glaser
- Uncle Luke
- Wayne LeGette
- Doug Lussenhop
- Jillian Mayer
- Adam Pally
- Robert Redford
- Mel Rodriguez
- Amy Seimetz
- Valentine Thomas
- Jessica Williams
- Saul Williams
- Casey Wilson
- Finn Wolfhard

== Reception ==
The film has a 50% rating on Rotten Tomatoes.

Dennis Harvey of Variety gave the film a mixed review, describing it as "an absurdist delight until it wears out its welcome" and an "adventurous experiment with some great bits, and might yet achieve the cult status that would’ve been ensured by a less unwieldy scope" concluding "there’s so much crazy invention to this project, it’s a pity the whole is exhaustingly so much less than the sum of its parts."

Monica Castillo of RogerEbert.com gave the film a positive review and wrote that it "delivers on its colorful and strange vision of Florida."

Rafael Motamayor of The Playlist gave the film a negative review, writing "Omniboat is a very weird film about a speedboat, and within minutes it becomes clear that it is the closest you’ll get to a film version of the “Florida Man” meme, for better or worse" concluding "what started as a magical, funny, and sweet tribute to Miami ends up capsizing..."

Ben Pearson of /Film gave the film a positive review, calling it "the wildest movie of Sundance 2020" and "an inexplicable, unforgettable, see-it-to-believe-it ode to one of the country’s most unique cities." He goes on to conclude "in a world in which Hollywood is dominated by intellectual property, I'm thrilled that these filmmakers willed into existence a piece of IP that's actually intellectual, as well as being bonkers, bizarre, and occasionally brilliant. I wouldn't even begin to know how to give this a traditional number rating, so instead I'll simply suggest that if you're an adventurous moviegoer and the opportunity ever arises to see this, grab as many of your friends as possible and check it out."

In a negative review, Anthony Kaufman of Screen Daily criticizes the film for "a lack of thematic unity" writing "with the filmmakers presumably given free rein to tackle their speedboat stories in whatever ways they choose, the overall film doesn’t cohere."

Bill Bria of Vague Visages gave the film a positive review, describing it as "irreverent, surreal, outrageous and harboring a surprising emotional depth" as well as "a portrait of the proud insanity of Florida, one that feels eminently authentic."

John Fink of The Film Stage gave the film a negative review, writing "a profound and poetic passage and a playful Fitzcarraldo allusion aside, Omniboat: A Fast Boat Fantasia is a shockingly bad picture" concluding that it "falls flat trying to throw so many things into the blender in an attempt to resist criticism with an IDGAF attitude."

David Bax in Battleship Pretension gave it a positive review, saying "Omniboat: A Fast Boat Fantasia takes us on a wet and wild ride for two hours."

In a positive review, Wolf of Geek Street called it "an acid trip of brilliance" that is "a wonderful, pretentious, dramatic, wild, and crazy ride" and "ready to be a cult classic."

Ryan Koo called it "outlandishly creative, inventive, entertaining, hilarious" on the No Film School Podcast.
