= Bing Bong =

Bing Bong or Bingbong may refer to:

- "Bing Bong" (song), by Super Furry Animals
- Vincent Crisologo, nicknamed "Bingbong" (born 1947) Filipino politician
- Salvador Medialdea, nicknamed "Bingbong" (born 1951) Filipino lawyer
- Richard Bong, leading ace of WWII and Medal of Honor recipient
- "Bing Bong", a comedic catchphrase popularized by web series Sidetalk and rallying cry for the New York Knicks
- Bing Bong, a place in the Northern Territory of Australia near McArthur River zinc mine
- Bing Bong, a character from the 2015 Pixar film Inside Out
- Bing Bong the Archer, Troy's character in the 2011 television episode "Advanced Dungeons & Dragons" of Community
- Bingbong, a character from the 2011 Philippine film The Woman in the Septic Tank
- Bing Bong Island, a fictional location from the 2002 video game Moop and Dreadly in the Treasure on Bing Bong Island
- The Bing Bong Brothers, a stage name used by musical comedy act The Lonely Island
- "Bing Bong", a song by American rapper Gorilla Nems
- Bing Bong, the mascot of the 2025 video game Peak

== See also ==
- Ping-pong (disambiguation)
- Bing (disambiguation)
- Bong (disambiguation)
