= Jillian Mayer =

American performance artist

- Mayer in her viral video, "I Am Your Grandma"
- Born: June 24, 1984 (age 42); Miami, Florida, U.S.
- Education: Florida International University
- Occupations: Performance Artist, Sculptor, Filmmaker
- Years active: 2010–present
- Notable work: I Am Your Grandma, Life and Freaky Times of Uncle Luke, 400 Nudes, Slumpies
- Website: jillianmayer.net

Jillian Mayer (born June 24, 1984) is a visual performance artist and filmmaker. She was born in Miami and is based there. Mayer's video works and performances have been displayed at galleries and museums internationally and film festivals such as SXSW and Sundance. Her work tends to focus on topics of technology and the Internet, and Rob Goyanes of Artsy has written that Mayer "probes the question of how technology is increasingly integrated into our lives...employing equal parts dystopian parody and real sincerity".

== Early life and education ==
Jillian Mayer was born in Miami in 1984 and graduated with a BFA from Florida International University in 2007.

== Career ==
Soon after graduating from college, Mayer was commissioned to create an experimental performance for Miami Light Project's 2010 Here & Now theater festival. The result was a short satirical musical called Mrs. Ms in which Mayer attempts to marry her pet Chihuahua, only to discover that he has been unfaithful. Also in 2010, she created a series of painted cut-out boards called "Getting to Know You", similar to cut out board scenes, including a series of photos posing with the boards.

=== Film ===
Mayer's short film Scenic Jogging was shown at the Guggenheim Museum in New York in 2010 as part of YouTube Play, and was selected as one of the event's 25 winners, which were also shown at the sister museums in Bilbao, Berlin, and Venice.

In 2011 she released the one minute short film I Am Your Grandma on YouTube, which went viral with over 4 million views. The film features Mayer giving a message to her eventual grandchildren in a variety of strange, futuristic costumes. CBS blogger William Goodman described it as "oddly hypnotizing," and it was selected to screen at many film festivals and art galleries.

She has frequently collaborated with writer Lucas Leyva, founder of the Borscht Film Festival, on short films such as Life and Freaky Times of Uncle Luke and Jacuzzi Boys: Glazin, and the two of them were listed together on Filmmaker Magazine's 2012 list of "New Faces of Independent Film". Life and Freaky Times of Uncle Luke is a modern Miami adaptation of the 1962 French short film La Jetée, starring Luther Campbell. The film is a told entirely through a series of installations created by Mayer, recounting Luke's rise to fame as he changes the face of hip-hop and fights for first amendment rights and later as he ushers Miami into a golden era of peace and prosperity as mayor., but everything changes when a nuclear meltdown at Turkey Point turns Miami into a radioactive wasteland filled with mutants, and Luke is the only survivor left unscathed. Jacuzzi Boys: Glazin reached 700,000 views on YouTube before it was removed for having vagina puppets.

The 2013 short film #PostModem is a satirical musical short film that takes place in the future and tackles digital identity and net neutrality through a series of vignettes. #PostModem was inspired by a band of the same name which Mayer was in, and was originally intended to be a musical feature film. Mayer and Leyva eventually realized that their concept was too expensive for feature length, despite being supported by Sundance's 2013 New Frontier Story Lab. The film was considered a "favorite of Sundance 2013" by IndieWire.

Mayer has also worked with anti-surveillance "CV dazzle" makeup. In "MakeUp Tutorial HOW TO HIDE FROM CAMERAS", she guides YouTubers with a makeup tutorial that teaches viewers how to hide from cameras and facial recognizing algorithms. "We all know that cameras are watching our every step," warns Mayer in the video's description. "The implementation of this makeup tutorial in your everyday life will be key to existing track-free."

Mayer and Leyva also teamed up in 2013 to make the animated short film Adventures of Christopher Bosh in the Multiverse!, which premiered at the Borscht Film Festival. It tells a fantastical story of Miami basketball star Christopher Bosh and faced legal action from Bosh's lawyers. They directed a web series called No Seasons for MTV in 2015, and their 2017 short film Kaiju Bunraku was picked up by The Criterion Collection to be paired with the film Mothra vs. Godzilla on the streaming platform Criterion Channel.

In 2017, Jillian performed the voice of a robot named Susan for the science-fiction film Everything Beautiful is Far Away.

Mayer co-directed the 2020 feature film Omniboat: A Fast Boat Fantasia, which was selected to screen at the 2020 Sundance Film Festival.

=== Artwork ===
Mayer's first solo show "Family Matters" opened in April 2011 at the David Castillo Gallery: a multimedia installation, it explored the "artificial worlds of '90s sitcoms" through sculptures and videos, including I Am Your Grandma which would later go viral on YouTube. "Erasey Page" was an interactive exhibit Mayer created, which gave the audience a chance to "erase" a website of their choice. It opened in April 2012 at the Bass Museum in Miami. Mayer also created 2013's "Precipice/PostModem" at Locust Projects in Miami, which was an installation that built upon her short film #PostModem.

Mayer worked on a project titled "400 Nudes", for which she selected four hundred nude selfies of women of all ages, shapes, and races from the pool of millions available on the Internet. She then staged photo shoots to remake them, digitally altering the composite photos to realistically replace the original faces with her own. To explore the gaps, as well as the overlaps, between different networks of image consumption, she then re-uploaded the photos to various platforms on the net. "400 Nudes" premiered at the La Biennale de Montreal on October 22, 2014.

Mayer was commissioned by the Miami International Airport in 2018 to create the installation "Still Life Scans", a series of photos taken using the TSA's airport x-ray scanners. In 2016 Mayer debuted a series of colorful sculptures she called "Slumpies", which are specially designed for users to slump on while staring at their smartphones. They have been exhibited internationally, including at Kunsthal Aarhus, Atlanta Contemporary Art Center, EXPO Chicago, University of California, and the Pérez Art Museum Miami.

Mayer is represented by David Castillo Gallery.

In 2023, Mayer was a contestant on The Exhibit: Finding the Next Great Artist, a reality TV series that aired on MTV and the Smithsonian Channel.

Literature

Mayer's work has been discussed in Code as Creative Medium (MIT Press), Dark Matters On the Surveillance of Blackness (Duke University Press), Paradox: The Body in the Age of AI (Carnegie Mellon), The Masquerade: A Panorama and the textbook Gateways to Art (Thames & Hudson).

== Personal life ==
Mayer has said that she intentionally conceals her real birthday from the public by using different dates on each social media platform.

== Selected filmography ==
Year	Film	Type	Notes	Link
2010	Scenic Jogging	Short film		
2011	I Am Your Grandma	Short film	with Lucas Leyva	
2011	Life and Freaky Times of Uncle Luke	Short film	with Lucas Leyva	
2011	Jacuzzi Boys: Glazin	Short film	with Lucas Leyva	
2013	#PostModem	Short film	with Lucas Leyva	
2013	Adventures of Christopher Bosh in the Multiverse!	Short film	with Lucas Leyva	
2015	Cool as Ice 2	Short film	with Lucas Leyva	
2015	Hot Beach Babe Aims to Please	Short film		
2015	No Seasons	Web series	with Lucas Leyva	
2017	Kaiju Bunraku	Short film	with Lucas Leyva	
2020	Omniboat: A Fast Boat Fantasia	Feature film	co-writer and co-director	
