= Ma (2015 film) =

1998 film

- Directed by: Celia Rowlson-Hall
- Written by: Celia Rowlson-Hall
- Produced by: Aaron Schnobrich; Lauren Smitelli
- Starring: Celia Rowlson-Hall
- Cinematography: Ian Bloom
- Edited by: Iva Radivojevic
- Music by: Brian McOmber
- Release date: 2015
- Running time: 83 minutes
- Language: English

Ma, graphically rendered as MA, is a 2015 drama film written and directed by Celia Rowlson-Hall, in her feature film debut. The film premiered at the 72nd edition of the Venice Film Festival, in the Venice Days sidebar.

== Cast ==
- Celia Rowlson-Hall as Ma
- Andrew Pastides as Daniel
- Amy Seimetz as Misti
- Matt Lauria as the cowboy
- Peter Vack as the priest
- Kentucker Audley as the policeman
- Michelle Perks as the maid

== Reception ==
On the review aggregator website Rotten Tomatoes, 92% of 13 critics' reviews are positive. Metacritic, which uses a weighted average, assigned the film a score of 67 out of 100, based on 7 critics, indicating "generally favorable" reviews.
