= Sam Kuhn =

American film director

- Born: Bainbridge Island, Washington
- Occupation: Filmmaker
- Notable work: Möbius, Finding Truelove, In Search of the Miraculous
- Website: http://samkuhn.us

Sam Kuhn (born February 7, 1989) is an American director, screenwriter and photographer. He has directed multiple short films, as well as several acclaimed music videos for bands such as Norah Jones., Here We Go Magic and Okay Kaya.

== Biography ==
Kuhn graduated from Willamette University in 2012 where he studied Humanities and creative writing.

== Works ==
Kuhn's directorial debut was the 2012 feature documentary Finding Truelove, which screened at the 2012 Hot Docs Canadian International Documentary Festival. Programmer Angie Driscoll referred to the film as "The documentary equivalent of a John Hughes movie, Finding Truelove is an exuberant comedy that pays homage to all things '80s [...] with pure energy and heart."

His follow up In Search of the Miraculous premiered at the 2015 Slamdance Film Festival, played Festival du Nouveau Cinema, Maryland Film Festival, and was featured online by Filmmaker Magazine.

In January 2016 the Northwest Film Center honored Kuhn and his collaborators' past work with a collective screening of all films to date.

Kuhn's most recent short Möbius was the only American film to premiere in competition at the 2017 Cannes Film Festival as part of Critics' Week. It was described by staff writer Thomas Fouet as "a mastered teen-movie.". Indiewire compared the film to the work of David Lynch, in that it "blends sweeping shots of the Northwestern terrain with the creeping sense that not all is what it seems". Vice Magazine billed Möbius as a "Gothic Teen Romance... Sparkling with death and magic." During the film's premiere, Kuhn published a diary of the experience for Filmmaker Magazine tracking a strange encounter he had with an Obsidian stone gifted outside Lynch's suite. It was consequentially acquired by the Criterion Collection and honored as part of the MoMA's New Directors/New Films Festival

== Filmography ==
| Year | Title | Format |
|---|---|---|
| 2012 | Finding Truelove | Documentary Feature |
| 2015 | In Search of the Miraculous | Short Film |
| 2015 | MIT Bricks | Short Documentary |
| 2016 | Z | Documentary Short |
| 2017 | Möbius | Short Film |
| 2026 | Anima | Feature Film |

== Music videos ==
| Year | Title | Artist |
|---|---|---|
| 2013 | It Doesn't Matter | Aerial East |
| 2015 | I'm Stupid But I Love You | Okay Kaya |
| 2015 | Falling | Here We Go Magic |
| 2015 | Be Small | Here We Go Magic |
| 2016 | Maryanne Was Quiet | Luke Temple |
| 2017 | Flipside | Norah Jones |
