= Ping Pong (Jacuzzi Boys album) =

Studio album by Jacuzzi Boys
- Released: October 21, 2016
- Recorded: July–August 2015
- Length: 39:14
- Label: Self-released
- Producer: Jim Kissling

Jacuzzi Boys chronology
Jacuzzi Boys (2013)	Ping Pong (2016)

Singles from Ping Pong
- 1. "Boys Like Blood" Released: August 18, 2016; 2. "Lucky Blade" Released: October 6, 2016

Professional ratings
Aggregate scores
Source	Rating
Album of the Year	59/100
Metacritic	63/100
Review scores
Source	Rating
AllMusic	2.5/5 stars
Magnet	6.5/10 stars
Pitchfork	6.6/10
PopMatters	7/10 stars
Pretty Much Amazing	C
The Spill Magazine	7.0/10

Ping Pong is the fourth studio album by American surf rock band, Jacuzzi Boys. The album was self-released on October 21, 2016.

== Track listing ==
All music is composed by Jacuzzi Boys, except where otherwise indicated.

No.	Title	Length
1.	"Lucky Blade"	3:31
2.	"Boys Like Blood"	3:12
3.	"Refrigeration"	2:21
4.	"Seventeen"	4:04
5.	"Can't Fight Forever"	3:40
6.	"Easy Motion"	1:55
7.	"New Cross"	1:17
8.	"Zoo"	2:47
9.	"Gamma"	3:09
10.	"Strange Exchange"	3:22
11.	"Iodine"	3:29
12.	"Tip Of My Tongue / Edge Of My Brain"	6:27
Total length:		39:14
