= David Castillo Gallery =

Coordinates: 25.8131°N 80.1915°W

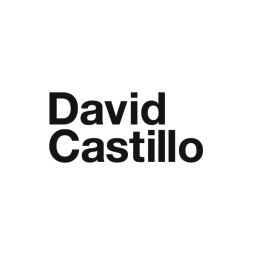
- Company type: Private
- Headquarters: Miami, Florida, United States
- Website: www.davidcastillogallery.com

The David Castillo Gallery is an art gallery in Miami Design District. It was opened by David Castillo in 2005.

The gallery has participated in art fairs including Art Basel Miami Beach and The Armory Show.
