= Booty bass =

The term booty bass can refer to several different, loosely related hip hop related genres of music:

- Miami Bass – largely based in Miami, but also found throughout Florida and elsewhere in the south. It is essentially the second form of hip hop to come into existence, but was relatively unknown until the 1990s, when the music had become stigmatized because of its explicit lyrics; notable acts include 2 Live Crew and Quad City DJ's
- Ghetto House – refers to later period Dance Mania Records recording artists. This is a brand of new school house music performers who loop often X-rated lyrics over house beats. Chicago ghetto house and Juke Music have started becoming very popular in other parts of the world.
- Baltimore Club – Also known as Baltimore breaks, this genre is popular mostly in Maryland, and sounds somewhat similar to Chicago ghetto house, with the exception of being based on breakbeats instead of house music. The tempos are far faster than either genre, and it maintains the repetitive nature of modern post-rave global electronic dance music.
- Hyphy – emerged out of the San Francisco Bay Area, particularly Oakland, and draw from genres like G-funk and Crunk. It is characterized by a heavy bass line and high energy.
