= Jacuzzi Boys =

American rock band

- Origin: Miami, Florida, United States
- Genres: Garage rock; indie rock; surf rock; lo-fi
- Years active: 2007–present
- Labels: Hardly Art
- Members: Gabriel Alcala; Danny Gonzales; Diego Monasterios
- Website: https://www.facebook.com/jacuzziboys/

Jacuzzi Boys are an American rock band based out of Miami, Florida. The band is composed of Gabriel Alcala on vocals and guitar, Diego Monasterios on drums and Danny Gonzales on bass.

The band formed in Miami in 2007 through Alcala and Monasterios. Bassist Gonzales was brought on to complete the band shortly thereafter. Early on, the band signed with Orlando, Florida-based label Floridas Dying. In 2009, the band released their debut studio album, No Seasons. The album received critical acclaim and even received an endorsement from Iggy Pop in an interview with Urban Outfitters. This led to the band opening for Iggy Pop. The success of the album saw Jacuzzi Boys sign with Hardly Art, a distributor of Sub Pop Records. Under Hardly Art, Jacuzzi Boys released their second and third studio albums, Glazin' in 2011, and their self-titled album in 2013. After their third studio album, they left the label and self-released their fourth studio album, Ping Pong, in 2016. That same year, they released their first commercially released EP, Happy Damage.

Since the release of Ping Pong, the band has put out a remix album in 2017 and a compilation album, Singles 'N' Stuff.

== Discography ==
=== Studio albums ===
- No Seasons (2009)
- Glazin' (2011)
- Jacuzzi Boys (2013)
- Ping Pong (2016)

=== Extended plays ===
- Happy Damage (2016)

=== Singles ===
- "Bricks or Coconuts" (2010)
- "Double Vision" (2013)
- "Boys Like Blood" (2016)
- "Lucky Blade" (2016)
- "Fake Flowers" (2017)
- "Something's Off" (2018)
- "Nosh Lately" (2018)
- "The Caveman" (2019)

== Members ==
- Gabriel Alcala — vocals, guitar (2007–present)
- Danny Gonzales — bass (2008–present)
- Diego Monasterios — drums (2007–present)
