= Faren Humes =

American filmmaker (born 1986)

- Born: 1986 (age 39–40); Miami, Florida, U.S.
- Education: University of Florida; Florida State University College of Motion Picture Arts (MFA)
- Occupation: Filmmaker
- Years active: 2010–present
- Awards: Guggenheim Fellowship (2021)

Faren Humes (born 1986) is an American filmmaker. She directed the short film Liberty (2018), winning several film festival awards for it, including from the Berlin Film Festival, Chicago International Film Festival, and SXSW Film Festival. She is a 2021 Guggenheim Fellow.

== Biography ==
Humes was born in 1986 in Miami. She went to the University of Florida and originally studied broadcast journalism, before she instead became interested in film after seeing a student film at a party. She then attended the Florida State University College of Motion Picture Arts and obtained an MFA in 2011.

Humes' MFA thesis film Our Rhineland, a period drama that touches on Nazi eugenics, won a Academy of Television Arts & Sciences College Television Award and Directors Guild of America Student Film Award. She also made another short called Macho, confronting themes such as Southern hypermasculinity and violence against transgender people in the United States. Juan Antonio Barquin said that "Humes delivers work that feels relevant and necessary." She was worked as a production designer and location manager, with her work including Moonlight (2016). She also worked as a film teacher in Miami, as well as an intern for Jonathan Demme in New York.

As a 2018 fellow for Film Independent's Project Involve project, Humes directed and wrote Liberty, a short film at the Liberty Square public housing complex in Miami. Liberty used improvisation instead of a screenplay. Vadim Rizov said that "Issues of politics, gentrification, community and epistemology subtly collide" in the film. She won several awards for Liberty, including at the AFI Film Festival, Berlin Film Festival, Chicago International Film Festival, Miami Film Festival, and SXSW Film Festival. She was featured in Filmmaker's 25 New Faces of Independent Film 2019.

In 2020, Humes participated in the 2nd Annual Black Women's Film Conference. In 2021, she was awarded a Guggenheim Fellowship and a United States Artists Fellowship.

Humes lives in Miami Gardens, Florida.

== Filmography ==
Year	Title	Notes	Ref.
2010	Nasir		
2011	Our Rhineland		
2016	Macho		
2019	Liberty	As writer and director	
TBA	Don't Stop, Get It, Get It		

== Awards ==
Award	Year	Category	Recipient(s)	Result	Ref.
69th Berlin International Film Festival	2019	Special Prize of the Generation 14plus International Jury for Best Short Film	Liberty	Won	
South by Southwest Film Festival	2019	Documentary Feature Narrative Shorts Award	Liberty	Won	
55th Chicago International Film Festival	2019	Gold Hugo for Live Action Short Film Competition	Liberty	Won	
