= Filmmaker (magazine) =

American publication

- Editor: Mike Hogan (Editorial Director); Chloe Lizotte (Content Director)
- Former editors: Scott Macaulay (1992-2026)
- Categories: Cinema
- Frequency: Quarterly
- Circulation: 60,000
- Founder: Scott Macaulay, Holly Willis, Karol Martesko-Fenster
- First issue: October 17, 1992
- Company: Independent Filmmaker Project
- Country: United States
- Based in: New York City
- Language: English
- Website: filmmakermagazine.com
- ISSN: 1063-8954

Filmmaker is a quarterly publication magazine covering issues relating to the independent film industry. The magazine was founded in 1992 by Karol Martesko-Fenster, Scott Macaulay and Holly Willis. The magazine is now published by the IFP (Independent Filmmaker Project), which acts in the independent film community.

== Background ==
The magazine was launched in 1992, as a merger between the two magazines run by IFP (The Off-Hollywood Report, 1986-1992) and IFP/West ("Montage: the Unruly Magazine of Independent Film.")

With a readership of more than 60,000, the magazine includes interviews, case studies, financing and distribution information, festival reports, technical and production updates, legal pointers, and filmmakers on filmmaking in their own words.

The magazine used to be available outside the US in London but has not been on sale in the UK since early 2009. It has been printed on a regularly quarterly schedule, only missing one print release in the summer of 2020 during the global pandemic, instead releasing this issue by PDF.

== Annual features ==
25 New Faces of Independent Film: Each year (typically in the Summer issue), Filmmaker publishes its list of independent film's emerging talent. The list typically contains directors, producers, actors and animators. Past lists have featured Ryan Gosling, Andrew Bujalski, Anna Boden, Ryan Fleck, Greg Pak, Oren Peli, Miranda July, Tze Chun, Jay Duplass & Mark Duplass, Zoe Kazan, Lena Dunham, Rooney Mara, Azazel Jacobs, Craig Zobel, Elliot Page, and Hilary Swank.

== List of issues ==
Issue	Cover
#0 Fall 1992	Simple Men
#1 Winter 1992/93	Bad Lieutenant
#2 Spring 1993	Aileen: Life and Death of a Serial Killer
#3 Summer 1993	Crush
#4 Fall 1993	Wittgenstein
#5 Winter 1993/94	Suture
#6 Spring 1994	Go Fish
#7 Summer 1994	Pulp Fiction
#8 Fall 1994	Hal Hartley interviews Jean-Luc Godard
#9 Winter 1995	Before Sunrise
#10 Spring 1995	Crumb
#11 Summer 1995	Safe
#12 Fall 1995	Four Rooms
#13 Winter 1996	Spike, Mike, Slackers, & Dykes
#14 Spring 1996	I Shot Andy Warhol
#15 Summer 1996	Lone Star
#16 Fall 1996	"The 50 Most Important Independent Films"
#17 Winter 1997	Crash
#18 Spring 1997	Chasing Amy
#19 Summer 1997	Star Maps
#20 Fall 1997	Fast, Cheap & Out of Control
#21 Winter 1998	Buffalo '66 / The Apostle (Note: This issue featured two cover variants."Editor's Note". Filmmaker. Vol. 6, no. 2. Fall 1997.)
#22 Spring 1998	Hana-bi
#23 Summer 1998	Pi
#24 Fall 1998	Happiness
#25 Winter 1999	The 24 Hour Woman
#26 Spring 1999	Run Lola Run
#27 Summer 1999	Twin Falls Idaho
#28 Fall 1999	Boys Don't Cry
#29 Winter 2000	American Psycho
#30 Spring 2000	Chuck & Buck
#31 Summer 2000	Girlfight
#32 Fall 2000	Shadow of the Vampire
#33 Winter 2001	Memento
#34 Spring 2001	Hedwig and the Angry Inch
#35 Summer 2001	"25 New Faces of Independent Film"
#36 Fall 2001	Amelie
#37 Winter 2002	Monsoon Wedding
#38 Spring 2002	The Cremaster Cycle
#39 Summer 2002	Full Frontal
#40 Fall 2002	Bowling for Columbine
#41 Winter 2003	Better Luck Tomorrow
#42 Spring 2003	"Breaking In"
#43 Summer 2003	Thirteen
#44 Fall 2003	Lost in Translation
#45 Winter 2004	Dogville
#46 Spring 2004	Coffee & Cigarettes
#47 Summer 2004	The Motorcycle Diaries
#48 Fall 2004	I Heart Huckabees
#49 Winter 2005	The Ballad of Jack and Rose
#50 Spring 2005	Me and You and Everyone We Know
#51 Summer 2005	Hustle & Flow
#52 Fall 2005	Brokeback Mountain
#53 Winter 2006	The Three Burials of Melquiades Estrada
#54 Spring 2006	A Prairie Home Companion
#55 Summer 2006	Half Nelson
#56 Fall 2006	Little Children
#57 Winter 2007	Stephanie Daley
#58 Spring 2007	Away From Her
#59 Summer 2007	Interview
#60 Fall 2007	I'm Not There
#61 Winter 2008	Be Kind Rewind
#62 Spring 2008	Mister Lonely
#63 Summer 2008	Frozen River
#64 Fall 2008	Che
#65 Winter 2009	Medicine For Melancholy
#66 Spring 2009	The Hurt Locker
#67 Summer 2009	Inglourious Basterds
#68 Fall 2009	Precious
#69 Winter 2010	The Exploding Girl
#70 Spring 2010	Winter's Bone
#71 Summer 2010	"25 New Faces of Independent Film"
#72 Fall 2010	127 Hours
#73 Winter 2011	Meek's Cutoff
#74 Spring 2011	Beginners
#75 Summer 2011	Another Earth
#76 Fall 2011	A Dangerous Method
#77 Winter 2011	The Innkeepers
#78 Spring 2012	Moonrise Kingdom
#79 Summer 2012	2 Days in New York
#80 Fall 2012	Silver Linings Playbook
#81 Winter 2013	Upstream Color
#82 Spring 2013	Frances Ha
#83 Summer 2013	Fruitvale Station
#84 Fall 2013	All Is Lost
#85 Winter 2014	Enemy
#86 Spring 2014	Obvious Child
#87 Summer 2014	Boyhood
#88 Fall 2014	Citizenfour
#89 Winter 2015	Kumiko, the Treasure Hunter
#90 Spring 2015	Me and Earl and the Dying Girl
#91 Summer 2015	The Look of Silence
#92 Fall 2015	Carol
#93 Winter 2016	The Girlfriend Experience
#94 Spring 2016	The Fits
#95 Summer 2016	Cameraperson
#96 Fall 2016	Manchester by the Sea
#97 Winter 2017	"The Future of Virtual Reality"
#98 Spring 2017	The Lost City of Z
#99 Summer 2017	Good Time
#100 Fall 2017	The Florida Project
#101 Winter 2018	Wormwood
#102 Spring 2018	The Rider
#103 Summer 2018	Madeline's Madeline
#104 Fall 2018	Suspiria
#105 Winter 2019	Roma
#106 Spring 2019	High Life
#107 Summer 2019	The Farewell
#108 Fall 2019	Parasite
#109 Winter 2020	Uncut Gems
#110 Spring 2020	Never Rarely Sometimes Always
#111 Summer 2020 (Note: Due to the global pandemic, a physical issue was not printed, issue was available only through a 200 page PDF.)	Time
#112 Fall 2020	Let Them All Talk
#113 Winter 2021	Nomadland
#114 Spring 2021	Malni: Towards the Ocean, Towards the Shore
#115 Summer 2021	Summer of Soul
#116 Fall 2021	Last Night in Soho
#117 Winter 2022	Memoria
#118 Spring 2022	The Northman
#119 Summer 2022	Fire of Love
#120 Fall 2022	All the Beauty and the Bloodshed
#121 Winter 2023	Glass Onion: A Knives Out Mystery
#122 Spring 2023	A Thousand and One
#123 Summer 2023	Earth Mama
#124 Fall 2023	Anatomy of a Fall
#125 Winter 2024	The Taste of Things
#126 Spring 2024	I Saw the TV Glow
#127 Summer 2024	Between the Temples
#128 Fall 2024	Anora
#129 Winter 2025	Nickel Boys
#130 Spring 2025	Caught by the Tides
#131 Summer 2025	Sorry, Baby
#132 Fall 2025	If I Had Legs I'd Kick You
#133 Winter 2026	Sirāt
#134 Spring 2026	Mother Mary
#135 Summer 2026	"Between the Sheets"
#136 Fall 2026	The History of Concrete

=== List of "25 New Faces of Indie Film" from 1998 to 2023 ===
==== 1998 ====
- Lance Acord
- Peter Sarsgaard
- Jamie Babbit
- David Birdsell
- Darren Stein
- Hilary Brougher
- P. David Ebersole
- Christina Ray Eichman
- Matthew Irving
- Mary Kuryla
- Craig Marsden
- Sanjay Mishra
- David Munro
- Pop Will Eat Itself
- Benita Raphan
- Tami Reiker
- Greg Sax
- Shudder to Think
- Elizabeth Schub
- Cauleen Smith
- Amy Talkington
- Amy Vincent
- Lisa Wiegand
- Yvonne Welbon
- Jessica Yu

==== 1999 ====
- Janet McTeer
- Matthew Libatique
- Eva Ilona Brzeski
- James Chinlund
- Nisha Ganatra
- Theodore Shapiro
- Tom Krueger
- Lindsay Jewett
- Erik Loyer
- Jim Tobias
- Tom E. Brown
- Patrick Stettner
- Karyn Kusama
- Angela Robinson
- Shari Roman & Sophia Fiennes
- David Kaplan
- Joel Hopkins
- Kurt Kuenne
- Heidi Van Lier
- Jennifer Gentile
- Hilary Swank
- Wash Westmoreland
- Tom Hodges
- Jonathan Weiss

==== 2000 ====
- Tim Orr
- Alex Rivera
- Tatia Rosenthal
- Michael Pitt
- Fran Krause
- Kenya T. Tiller
- Gary Hawkins
- Isaac Webb
- Greg Pritikin
- Peter Sollett & Eva Vives
- Cintra Wilson
- David Kartch
- Anthony Hardwick
- Marlene Rhein
- Cinque Northern
- Rolf Gibbs
- Laura Colella
- Senor Amor & Danielle Luppi
- Arjun Dhasin
- Aaron Woodley
- Damani Baker
- Erin Cressida Wilson
- Bradley Rust Gray

==== 2001 ====
- David Guion & Michael Handelman
- Agnieszka Wojtowicz-Vosloo
- Doug Sadler
- Ryan Gosling
- Monique Matthews
- Ari Gold
- Chris Papierniak
- Brett Vapnek
- Todd Stevens
- Kat Smith
- Don Hertzfeldt
- Paul Harrill
- Bradley Beesley
- Minh Nguyen-Vo
- Eric Deutschman
- Mike Jones
- Nicholas Hay
- David Von Ancken
- David Fickas
- Todd Hughes
- Zoe Poledouris
- Scott Coffey

==== 2002 ====
- Aaron Stanford
- Judy Becker
- Steven Pippman
- Geoff Haley
- Brian To
- Garrett Scott
- J.T. Petty
- deco dawson
- Daniel Junge
- Neil Burger
- Divya Srinivasan
- Josslyn Luckett
- Lisa Collins
- Craig Brewer
- Przemyslaw Reut
- M. Stark & Jacob Meszaros
- Coleman Hough
- Grace Lee
- Justin Haythe
- Steve Beatrice
- Lucy Walker
- Nicole Cattell
- Joshua Marston
- Davidson Cole

==== 2003 ====
- Tasha Oldham
- Jesse Moss
- Steven Tsuchida
- Seith Mann
- Jessica Sharzer
- Adam Bhala Lough
- Bradley Peyton
- Ben Coccio
- Tom Putnam
- Shari Frilot
- Stefan Nadelman
- Victor Viyuoh
- Patty Jenkins
- Irene Lusztig
- David Russo
- Ghazi Albuliwi
- Andrew Bujalski
- Matt Goldman
- Greg Pak
- Brett Ingram
- Matt Smith
- Elliot Greenebaum
- Jen Sachs
- Luis Carmara Silva & Gabrielle Galanter

==== 2004 ====
- Miranda July
- Jacob Aaron Estes
- Marcelo Zarvos
- Ryya Elias
- Andrij Parekh
- Rosario Garcia-Montero
- Ryan Eslinger
- Ryan Johnson & Gena Levy
- Elena Elmoznino
- Cess Silvera
- Margaret Harris
- Micah Schraft & Abdi Nazemian
- Larry Blackhorse Lowe
- Ellie Lee
- Stephen Adly Guirgis
- Anna Boden & Ryan Fleck
- Kazuo Ohno
- Rania Ajami
- Mario De La Vega
- Annemarie Jacir
- Kulture Machine
- Lou Taylor Pucci

==== 2005 ====
- Brent Green
- Elizabeth Chai Vasarhelyi
- Cary Joji Fukunaga
- Opa Joe Sampson
- Kyle Henry
- Keith Bearden
- Rachel Boynton
- Danielle Lurie
- Cam Archer
- Patricia Riggen
- Jake Mahaffy
- Neil Dela Llana & Ian Gamazon
- Victor Buhler
- Don Handfield
- Mary Jordan
- Stew
- Mark Banning & Mad Matthewz
- Nicholas Jarecki
- Rachel Grady & Heidi Ewing
- Oliver Cheetham
- Lori Silverbush & Michael Skolnik
- Joby Harold
- Chase Palmer
- Marshall Curry
- Elliot Page

==== 2006 ====
- Olivia Thirlby
- Linas Phillips
- Ham Tran
- So Yong Kim
- Scott Z. Burns
- Antonio Campos
- Gary Huggins
- Carter Smith
- Astra Taylor
- Michele Civetta
- Esther Robinson
- Alex Karpovsky
- Aurora Guerrero
- Eunhee Cho
- Neistat Brothers
- Nee Brothers
- Pastor Brothers
- Michael Tully
- Paul Soter
- Lars Knudsen & Jay Van Hoy
- John Maringouin
- Sameh Zaobi
- Kevin Jerome Everson
- Todd Rohal
- PJ Raval

==== 2007 ====
- Moon Molson
- Sophie Barthes
- Daniel Barz
- Jennifer Venditti
- Kim Reed
- Andy Blubaugh
- Azazel Jacobs
- Calvin Reeder
- Fillipe Barbosa
- Craig Zobel
- Phillip Van
- Sean Kirby
- Tze Chun
- Richard Goldgewicht & Jeremy Goldscheider
- Vicente Amorim
- M dot Strange
- Kentucker Audley
- Hope Dickson Leach
- Ronald Bronstein
- Vineet Dewan
- Georgina Lightning
- Brian M. Cassidy and Melanie Shatzky
- Jess Weixler
- Alex Holdridge
- Stephane Gauger

==== 2008 ====
- Jesse Epstein
- Andrew Okpeaha MacLean
- Tariq Tapa
- Joshua Safdie
- Ryan Bilsborrow-Koo and Zachary Lieberman
- Christina Voros
- Bent-Jorgen Perlmutt
- Jennifer Phang
- Barry Jenkins
- Shana Feste
- Daniel Robin
- Tom Quinn
- John Magary
- Oren Peli
- Matt Wolf
- Myna Joseph
- Encyclopedia Pictura
- Mark Russell
- E.E. Cassidy
- Dee Rees
- Aasif Mandvi
- David & Nathan Zellner
- Eric Latek
- Julia Leigh
- Benh Zeitlin

==== 2009 ====
- Ian Olds
- Eleanor Burke & Ron Eyal
- Nat Sanders
- Jessica Oreck
- Derek Cianfrance
- Jeff Mizushima
- Lost Zombies
- Paula Huidobro
- Steph Green
- Bradford Young
- Michael Palmieri & Donal Mosher
- Paola Mendoza
- Destin Daniel Cretton
- Morgan Jon Fox
- The Purchase Brothers
- Nicole Opper
- Asiel Norton
- Andrew T. Betzer
- Sebastián Silva
- Tina Mabry
- Frankie Latina
- Lena Dunham
- Geoff Marslett
- Rooney Mara
- Jody Lee Lipes

==== 2010 ====
- Victoria Mahoney
- Alex Jablonski & Michael Totten
- Rashaad Ernesto Green
- Sara Colangelo
- Robert Machoian & Rodrigo Ojeda-Beck
- Jason Byrne
- Trieste Kelly Dunn
- Sean Durkin
- Rebecca Richman Cohen
- Julius Onah
- Zac Stuart-Pontier
- Holden Abigail Osborne
- David Wilson
- Radical Friend (Kirby McClure & Julia Grigorian)
- Marc Fratello
- Brent Stewart
- Jade Healy
- Sultan Sharrief
- Mike Stoklasa
- Kasper Tuxen
- Susan Youssef
- Danfung Dennis
- Arielle Javitch
- Matt Porterfield
- Adam Bowers

==== 2011 ====
- Alrick Brown
- Joe Nicolosi
- Alma Har’el
- Kitao Sakurai
- David Lowery
- Eddie Alcazar
- Yance Ford
- Laura Israel
- Everynone
- Panos Cosmatos
- Sophia Takal
- Brent Bonacorso
- Mark Jackson
- Kirby Ferguson
- Damon Russell
- Gingger Shankar
- Brent Hoff
- Sheldon Candis
- Carlen Altman
- Rola Nashef
- Alison Klayman
- Rania Attieh & Daniel Garcia
- Rob Hauer
- Dean Fleischer-Camp & Jenny Slate
- Andrew S. Allen & Jason Sondhi

==== 2012 ====
- Desiree Akhavan and Ingrid Jungermann
- Jonas Carpignano
- Ian Clark
- Ryan Coogler
- Drea Cooper and Zackary Canepari
- Chris Dapkins
- Katherine Fairfax Wright and Malika Zouhali-Worrall
- Hannah Fidell
- Julia Garner
- Ian Harnarine
- Cutter Hodierne
- Alexa Karolinski
- Penny Lane and Brian Frye
- Jillian Mayer and Lucas Leyva
- Omar Mullick and Bassam Tariq
- Terence Nance
- ornana
- Julia Pott
- A. G. Rojas
- Kim Sherman
- Jason Tippet and Elisabeth Mims
- Wu Tsang
- Patrick Wang
- Treva Wurmfeld

==== 2013 ====
- Scott Blake
- Lyric R. Cabral and David Felix Sutcliff
- Emily Carmichael
- Josephine Decker
- Anahita Ghazvinizadeh
- Mohammad Gorjestani
- Daniel Hart
- Eliza Hittman
- Boyd Holbrook
- Lou Howe
- Andrew Thomas Huang
- Elaine McMillion
- Jason Osder
- Andrew Droz Palermo
- Iva Radivojevic
- Nandan Rao
- Rodrigo Reyes
- Anna Sandilands and Ewan McNico
- Ben Sinclair and Katja Blichfeld
- Leah Shore
- Andrea Sisson and Pete Ohs
- Jeremy Teicher
- Michael Tyburski and Ben Nabors
- Lauren Wolkstein
- Chloé Zhao

==== 2014 ====
- Joe Callander
- Frances Bodomo
- Robert Eggers
- Jodie Mack
- Jessica Dimmock and Christopher LaMarca
- Bernardo Britto
- Jamey Phillips
- Scott Cummings
- Zeek Earl and Chris Caldwell
- Kogonada
- Josef Wladyka and Alan Blanco
- Annie Silverstein
- Matt Sobel
- Gina Telaroli
- Ana Lily Amirpour
- Janicza Bravo
- Lily Henderson
- Nicole Riegel
- Sean Porter
- Darius Clark Monroe
- Rich Vreeland
- Charlotte Glynn
- Heidi Saman
- Dustin Guy Defa
- Lev Kalman and Whitney Horn

==== 2015 ====
- Elizabeth Lo
- Reinaldo Marcus Green
- Andrew Hasse and Megan Brooks
- Trey Edward Shults
- Khalik Allah
- Pia Borg and Edward Lawrenson
- Pippa Bianco
- Ian Samuels
- Cecilia Aldarondo
- Anna Rose Holmer
- Ted Fendt
- Britni West
- Nick Berardini and Jamie Gonçalves
- RaMell Ross
- Tayarisha Poe
- Theo Anthony
- Viktor Jakovleski
- Celia Rowlson-Hall
- Jimmie Fails and Joe Talbot
- Shevaun Mizrahi
- Juan Pablo Gonzalez
- Jack Dunphy
- Anthony Onah
- The Daniels
- Zia Anger

==== 2016 ====
- Sasha Lane
- Tom Rosenberg
- Ricardo Gaona
- Ivete Lucas and Patrick Bresnan
- Livia Ungur and Sherng-Lee Huang
- Amman Abbasi
- T. W. Pittman and Kelly Daniela Norris
- Jess dela Merced
- Jerónimo Rodríguez
- Graham Swon
- Katy Grannan
- Sonia Kennebeck
- Sabaah Folayan and Damon Davis
- MEMORY
- Connor Jessup
- Shawn Peters
- John Wilson
- James N. Kienitz Wilkins
- Macon Blair
- New Media Ltd.
- Brian McOmber
- Destini Riley and Nicholas Pilarski
- Ben Petrie

==== 2017 ====
- Laura Moss
- Robin Comisar
- Andrew Fitzgerald
- Ricky D'Ambrose
- Sam Kuhn
- Carmine Grimaldi
- Nellie Kluz
- Nilja Mu'min
- Chase Whiteside and Erick Stoll
- Elan and Jonathan Bogarin
- Alexa Lim Haas
- Celine Held and Logan George
- Liza Mandleup
- Cirocco Dunlap
- Ana Maria Vijdea
- Beth de Araújo
- Jonathan Olshefski
- Nabil Elderkin
- Jessica Kingdon
- Ilana Coleman
- Rachel Wolther and Alex H. Fischer
- Sofía Subercaseaux
- Kelvin Harrison Jr.
- Ja'Tovia Gary

==== 2018 ====
- Charlotte Wells
- Mariama Diallo
- Daniel Goldhaber & Isa Mazzei
- Helena Howard
- Kamau Bilal
- Richard Van
- Means of Production
- Paloma Martinez
- Carey Williams
- Aymar Jean Christian
- Marnie Ellen Hertzler
- Assia Boundaoui
- Miko Revereza
- Brad Bischoff
- Hannah Peterson
- Sebastián Pinzón Silva
- Jomo Fray
- Andrew Bruntel
- Alison Nguyen
- Sky Hopinka
- Z Behl
- Crystal Kayiza
- Melika Bass
- Meredith Zielke & Yoni Goldstein
- Channing Godfrey Peoples

==== 2019 ====
- Micaela Durand and Daniel Chew
- Sephora Woldu
- Andrew Patterson
- Deniz Tortum
- Alex Thompson and Kelly O'Sullivan
- Alison O'Daniel
- Diana Peralta
- Lance Oppenheim
- Matthew Puccini
- Meghan Fredrich
- A.V. Rockwell
- Lyle Mitchell Corbine Jr.
- Bo McGuire
- Courtney Stephens
- Sudarshan Suresh
- Norbert Shieh
- Michaela Olsen
- Todd Chandler
- Jessica Dunn Rovinelli
- Haley Elizabeth Anderson
- Barbara Cigarroa
- Carlo Mirabella-Davis
- Courtney and Hillary Andujar
- Faren Humes
- Billy Chew

==== 2020 ====
- Julia Mellen
- Daniel Hymanson
- Jeannie Nguyen
- Ephraim Asili
- Tayler Montague
- Daniel Antebi
- Keisha Rae Witherspoon
- Nadav Kurtz
- Isidore Bethel
- Shabier Kirchner
- Merawi Gerima
- Orian Barki and Meriem Bennani
- Hayley Garrigus
- Iliana Sosa
- Victoria Rivera
- Christine Haroutounian
- Joie Estrella Horwitz
- Neo Sora
- Darcy McKinnon
- Emma Seligman
- Madeleine Hunt-Ehrlich
- Moara Passoni
- Nikyatu Jusu
- Rajee Samarasinghe
- Joseph Sackett

==== 2021 ====
- Fox Maxy
- Rebecca Adorno
- Daniel Garber
- Faye Ruiz
- Jude Chehab
- Omnes Films
- Jason Park
- Frederic Da
- Suneil Sanzgiri
- Annalise Lockhart
- Nate Dorr & Nathan Kensinger
- Anthony Banua-Simon
- Karishma Dube
- Michelle Uranowitz & Daniel Jaffe
- Naz Riahi
- Meg Smaker
- Ramzi Bashour
- Wang Qiong
- Andrew Norman Wilson
- Isabel Castro
- Sushma Khadepaun
- Jordan Lord
- Nira Burstein
- Kate Gondwe
- Jazmin Jones

==== 2022 ====
- Xenia Matthews
- Erin Johnson
- Ellie Foumbi
- Ariela Barer
- Elizabeth Nichols
- Sam Max
- Chenliang Zhu
- Gabriela Ortega
- Antonio Marziale
- Tina Satter
- Jorge Sistos
- Lucy Kerr
- Alec Moeller
- Michele Mansoor
- Ash Goh Hua
- Darol Olu Kae
- Georden West
- Edy Modica
- Walter Thompson-Hernández
- Tij D'oyen
- Franklin Ritch
- Artemis Shaw and Prashanth Kamalakanthan
- Zandashé Brown
- Alex Morelli
- Jordan Strafer

==== 2023 ====
- Dwayne LeBlanc
- Abby Harri
- Zachary Epcar
- John Rosman
- Nyala Moon
- Sue Ding & Sarah Garrahan
- Craig Quintero
- Wes Goodrich
- Sarah Friedland
- Jess X. Snow
- Alex Prager
- Daniel Chein
- Maegan Houang
- Faye Tsakas
- Philip Thompson
- Kayla Abuda Galang
- Dustin Waldman
- Jane M. Wagner
- Samm Hodges
- Rachel Walden
- Aurora Brachman
- Ben Brewer
- Juliana Barreto Barreto
- Mackie Mallison
- Rashad Frett

==== 2024 ====
- Clementine Narcisse
- Tomi Faison
- Paris Peterson
- Carlos A.F. Lopez
- Amelia Evans
- Sam Shainberg
- Véra Haddad
- Bryn Silverman & Naveen Chaubal
- Eli Powers
- Julian Castronovo
- Alex Ashe
- Carin Leong
- Jared James Lank
- Nolam Plaas
- Jason Fitzroy Jeffers
- Joel Alfonso Vargas
- Caitlyn Greene
- Alex Ullom
- Ali Vanderkruyk
- Claire Read
- Annie Ning
- Philip Rabalais
- Masha Ko
- Angalis Field
- Emma D. Miller

==== 2025 ====
- Yace Sula
- Eliza Barry Callahan
- Pasqual Gutierrez
- Jinho Myung
- Curtis Miller
- Cheryl Wang
- Yeelen Cohen
- Chheangkea
- Heather Landsman
- Leonardo Pirondi
- Auden Lincoln-Vogel
- Kaitlyn Mikayla
- Loren Waters
- Sabrina Greco
- 5th Floor Pictures
- Annapurna Sriram
- Adesola Thomas
- Nate Gualtieri
- Pepi Ginsberg
- Katherine Montgomery
- LaTajh Simmons-Weaver
- Mariano Dongo
- Bianca Poletti
- Alexandre Singh and Natalia Musteata
- Birdy Wei-Ting Hung

==== 2026 ====
- Kevin Walker & Jack Auen
- Avalon Fast
- Yanis Gaye
- Caroline Golum
- Phoebe Jane Hart
- kekahi wahi
- Adam & Zack Khalil
- Sarah Lasley
- Michelle J. Li
- Alena Lodkina
- Saffron Maeve
- Danny Scharar & Harris Mayersohn
- Blair McClendon
- Lindsey Normington
- Juanita Onzaga
- Xenia Patricia
- Hansel Porras Garcia
- Inney Prakash
- Sophy Romvari
- Siyou Tan
- Mars Verrone
- Connor Sen Warnick
- Louise Weard
- Aidan Zamiri
- Charlotte Zhang
