= Celia Rowlson-Hall =

American performing artist

Rowlson-Hall at the 83rd Venice International Film Festival

Celia Rowlson-Hall is an American dancer, choreographer, and film director. She has choreographed numerous music videos and commercials, and has directed several short films. Her debut feature film, MA, was released in 2015.

== Early life ==
Rowlson-Hall grew up in Urbanna, Virginia, and began dancing at age five. She graduated from the University of North Carolina School of the Arts in 2006 with a Bachelor of Fine Arts in dance.

Rowlson-Hall has cited Pina Bausch’s dance theater and the British dance company DV8 as early influences on her career in dance and choreography.

== Career ==
Rowlson-Hall moved to New York after finishing college and initially worked in theater dance and choreography. She was mentored by New York choreographer Faye Driscoll, and won a Bessie Award for performance in Driscoll's 837 Venice Blvd in 2009. She first became involved in filmmaking in 2008, when director Ray Tintori hired her to choreograph the music video for MGMT's song "Electric Feel". In 2010, she directed her first short film, Prom Night, in which she also cast herself; it was nominated for a Grand Jury Award at South by Southwest. She went on to direct two further short films, The Audition (2012) and Si Nos Dejan (2013).

In 2013, Rowlson-Hall began working as a choreographer on the HBO series Girls; she also choreographed Girls creator Lena Dunham in a video for Vogue magazine. She has choreographed commercials for clients including Lee Jeans and Kate Spade New York, and music videos for artists including Alicia Keys and Sleigh Bells. She was named one of Filmmaker magazine's "25 New Faces of Independent Film" in 2015.

Rowlson-Hall's first feature film, MA (2015), is a modern retelling of the story of the Virgin Mary in which Rowlson-Hall plays the lead role. The film, which Rowlson-Hall funded via Kickstarter, was screened at the 72nd Venice International Film Festival and AFI Fest. In 2017, she created the short film (The [End) of History Illusion] for Miu Miu as the 14th installment in their Women's Tales series.

Rowlson-Hall portrays adult Sophie in the 2022 film Aftersun.

In 2025, Rowlson-Hall served as choreographer for The Testament of Ann Lee. In interviews, she mentions how her own religious upbringing in the Christian Scientist movement informed her approach to the film's choreography. Although she no longer participates in the religion, she described the film as an opportunity to revisit her relationship with prayer through choreography.

In the same year, Rowlson-Hall created and directed SISSY, a dance-theater work that premiered at the Baryshnikov Arts Center. The cast included dancers and actors such as Marisa Tomei and Lucas Hedges. This production was her first time back on stage after nearly two decades of working within the film industry. In October 2026, it was announced that Rowlson-Hall will continue working with the stage as the choreographer for the off-Broadway revival of Spring Awakening, with its opening performance slated for mid-December.

Rowlson-Hall was named Kaatsbaan Cultural Park's inaugural artist-in-residence. The residency will last from 2026 until 2029.

== Personal life ==
In September 2018, Rowlson-Hall married Mia Lidofsky, a filmmaker whom she had met in 2013 when they worked together on Girls. Rowlson-Hall and Lidofsky have one son.

== Filmography ==
=== Film; as actress ===
Year	Title	Role	Note
2010	Prom Night		Short film
2015	Ma	Ma	
2015	The Nutcracked	Clara	Short film
2015	A Morning Light	Ellyn	
2022	Aftersun	Adult Sophie	
2026	The Drama	Dance Instructor	

=== Film ===
Year	Title	Work					Note
Year	Title	Director	Writer	Producer	Editor	Choreographer	Note
2010	Prom Night	Co-director	Yes	Yes	No	Yes	
2013	The Audition	Yes	Yes	Yes	Yes	No	Short film
2014	Cover Girl	No	No	No	No	Yes	Short film
2015	Molly Takes a Trip	No	No	No	No	Yes	
2015	All These Voices	No	No	No	No	Yes	Short film
2015	Ma	Yes	Yes	No	No	Yes	
2015	The Nutcracked	Co-director	No	Yes	No	Yes	Short film
2017	The Incredible Jessica James	No	No	No	No	Yes	
2018	Tommy Battles the Silver Sea Dragon	No	No	No	No	Yes	
2020	Taxi!	Yes	No	Yes	No	No	Short film
2020	Omniboat: A Fast Boat Fantasia	Yes	No	No	No	No	
2021	After Yang	No	No	No	No	Yes	
2021	Birds of Paradise	No	No	No	No	Yes	
2024	Smile 2	No	No	No	No	Yes	
2025	The Plague	No	No	No	No	Yes	
2025	The Testament of Ann Lee	No	No	No	No	Yes	
2025	Merv	No	No	No	No	Yes	
2026	The Drama	No	No	No	No	Yes	

=== Television ===
Year	Title	Work			Note
Year	Title	Director	Producer	Choreographer	Note
2014	Manhattan Love Story	No	No	Yes	2 episodes
2014-2017	Girls	No	No	Yes	4 episodes
2017-2018	Strangers	Yes	Executive	Yes	3 episodes
2018	Orange Is the New Black	No	No	Yes	Episode; "Who Knows Better Than I"
2019	The Other Two	No	No	Yes	Episode; "Pilot"
2019	Tales of the City	No	No	Yes	3 episodes
2019	John Mulaney & the Sack Lunch Bunch	No	No	Yes	Television movie
2021-2022	Ziwe	No	No	Yes	10 episodes
2022	The Staircase	No	No	Yes	3 episodes
TBD	Constance	No	No	Yes	Television film; Completed

=== Music Videos ===
Year	Title	Work		Artist(s)	Album
Year	Title	Director	Choreographer	Artist(s)	Album
2008	"Electric Feel"	No	Yes	MGMT	Oracular Spectacular
2011	"Love In Motion"	No	Yes	SebastiAn, Mayer Hawthorne	Total
2016	In Common	No	Yes	Alicia Keys	Here
2019	"Cry Cry Cry"	No	Yes	Coldplay	Everyday Life
2020	"Win It"	Yes	No	Lola Kirke	
2025	"Love Takes Miles"	Yes	Yes	Cameron Winter	Heavy Metal
