= 2010 Sudanese general election in Jonglei =

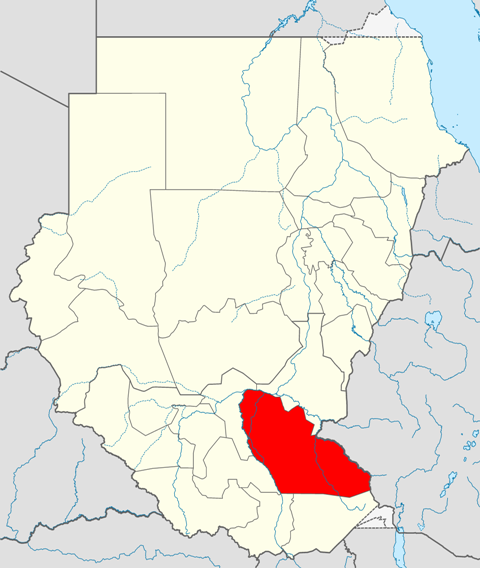
Jonglei State in 2010

Elections were held in Jonglei State on 11–15 April 2010 as part of the 2010 Sudanese general election, with voting for President of Sudan, National Assembly of Sudan, President of Southern Sudan, Southern Sudan Legislative Assembly, Governor of Jonglei State and the Jonglei State Legislative Assembly. The elections were the first in Sudan for over two decades, held in the aftermath of the 2005 Comprehensive Peace Agreement between the Sudan People's Liberation Movement (SPLM) and the Government of Sudan of Omar al-Bashir. The election was carried out in precarious security conditions, with ethnic conflicts prevalent in the state. The elections were won by the SPLM, with the exception of a handful of seats. Disputes over the election results led to the outbreak of two armed insurgencies.

== Electoral system ==
A new electoral law, the National Elections Act of 2008, was adopted in July 2008. For the elections for the presidencies of Sudan and South Sudan, elections would be held under an absolute majority system: If no candidate would obtained 50% of the votes cast plus one vote, a second round of the two most-voted candidates would be held. State governors, on the other hand, would be elected under a simple majority system whereby the most-voted candidate would be elected governor.

For the parliamentary elections (whether to the National Assembly, the Southern Sudan Legislative Assembly or the State Legislative Assemblies) the electoral legislation adopted in July 2008 stipulated a mixed electoral system:

- 60% of the parliamentarians would be elected through single-member First-past-the-post geographic constituencies.
- 15% of the parliamentarians would be elected through Party-list proportional representation.
- 25% of the parliamentarians would be elected through Party-list proportional representation for women candidates.

The delimitation of constituency boundaries was based on the national population census published in May 2009, a census whose accuracy was disputed. Per the 2008 electoral legislation, constituencies should have been delimitated within a 30-day period. The National Electoral Commission tasked the state-level High Electoral Commissions to draft the constituency boundary delimitations. According to the Carter Center report, constituencies were “"vague, unmapped, and difficult for observers and election officials to comprehend". The electoral legislation established that the population in each geography constituencies for the National Assembly must not deviate by more than 15% from the average population size of the 270 geographic constituencies for the National Assembly (145,017 inhabitants). In Jonglei, there were significant deviations from the legislation. The Bor South National Assembly geographic constituency in the Jonglei state capital had the largest deviation of all 270 National Assembly geographic constituencies, hosting a population 52% larger than the national average.

Estimated population size of National Assembly constituencies in Jonglei and variance from national average
No.	Counties	Population (2008 census)	Variance
1	Pigi	99,068	-31.69%
2	Old Fangak	110,130	-24.06%
3	Ayod	139,282	-3.95%
4	Nyirol	108,674	-25.06%
5	Uror	178,519	+23.10%
6	Twic East, Duk	150,937	+4.08%
7	Bor South	221,106	+52.47%
8	Akobo	136,210	-6.07%
9	Pibor, Pochalla	214,676	+48.04%

== Organization and context ==
At the time of the vote, Jonglei was the largest state in Sudan by area. The holding of the election presented logistic challenges, as much of the state was not reachable by road. There were 600 polling stations and 670 committees across the state. Mecak Ajang Alaak was the Chairman of the Jonglei State Election High Commission.

A United Nations Mission in Sudan helicopter assisted the authorities to transport voting materials back to the state capital Bor. Delays in receiving ballot boxes from polling stations resulted in delays of announcement of preliminary results. Observers from the Carter Center observed party agents assisting Election Commission workers in counting of votes, but refrained from stating that this would have been a systematic practice.

595,901 persons were registered as voters. This was estimated to correspond to 88% of the population aged 18 years and above. Each voter would be given 12 different ballots (President of Sudan, National Assembly of Sudan geographic constituency, National Assembly of Sudan Party-List, National Assembly of Sudan Women's List, President of Southern Sudan, Southern Sudan Legislative Assembly geographic constituency, Southern Sudan Legislative Assembly Party-List, Southern Sudan Legislative Assembly Women's List, Governor of Jonglei, Jonglei State Legislative Assembly geographic constituency, Jonglei State Legislative Assembly Party-List and Jonglei State Legislative Assembly Women's List).

From 2009 onwards inter-tribal violence in Jonglei escalated. In the run-up to the elections, politicians sought to capitalize on tribal rivalries to mobilize voters. Pre-electoral violence caused largescale population displacements in Jonglei.

== SPLM nominations ==
Ahead of the election, it was widely presumed that SPLM would win and thus competition over SPLM tickets was fierce. The State SPLM Electoral College met on 10 January 2010 to decide the party nominations for the April election. The meeting evaluated 228 potential candidates. The State SPLM Electoral College ranked five candidates for governor, leaving to the SPLM Political Bureau to finalize the decision. The State SPLM Electoral College named 91 candidates for the other posts up for election.

William Borien Gola was nominated by the State SPLM Electoral College as the candidate for the Pibor West (Gumuruk, Lekwongole) geographic constituency for the Southern Sudan Legislative Assembly, but this decision was over-ridden by the SPLM Political Bureau which named Francis Lokurunga as the SPLM candidate for the seat.

== Results ==
=== President of Sudan ===
Like in all southern states (except Upper Nile) the SPLM candidate Yasir Arman was the most voted presidential candidate. Yasir Arman finishing in second place nation-wide. The winning candidate and incumbent President Omar al-Bashir finished in third place in Jonglei. Independent candidate Mahmood Ahmed Jeha, who obtained 0.71% of the vote nation-wide, finished in second place in Jonglei. He obtained 39.50% of his nation-wide vote in Jonglei state alone.

Candidate	Party	Votes	%
Yasir Arman	Sudan People's Liberation Movement	128,267	65.62
Mahmood Ahmed Jeha	Independent	28,329	14.49
Omar al-Bashir	National Congress Party	24,167	12.36
Abdallah Deng Nhial	Popular Congress Party	8,708	4.46
Mubarak al-Fadil	Umma Reform and Renewal Party	3,230	1.65
Munir Sheikh El-din Jallab	New National Democratic Party	516	0.26
Sadiq al-Mahdi	National Umma Party	515	0.26
Fatima Abdel Mahmoud	Sudanese Socialist Democratic Union	462	0.24
Hatim Al-Sir	Democratic Unionist Party	358	0.18
Muhammad Ibrahim Nugud	Sudanese Communist Party	328	0.17
Abdel-Aziz Khalid	Sudanese National Alliance	296	0.15
Kamil Idris	Independent	287	0.15
Total		195,463	100.00
Registered voters/turnout		595,901	–

=== National Assembly of Sudan ===
Jonglei elected 9 deputies from First-past-the-post single member constituencies, 2 deputies from Party-list proportional representation vote and 4 deputies from Women's list vote (also Party-list proportional representation). SPLM won all seats, except the 8th parliamentary constituency (Akobo County) were the NCP candidate Riek Gai Kok defeated the SPLM candidate. In the case of the 6th constituency (Twic East County, Duk County) the SPLM candidate Atem Garang Deng was elected by acclamation.

The deputies elected on the Party-list were Lual Achuek Lual (Twic East County) and David Dhil Chol (Ayod County). The deputies elected on the Women's List were Emelda Modi Benerato (Akobo County), Munira John Abdelwahab (Pochalla County), Elizabeth John Kuol Akech (Pigi County) and Anna Abyei Wuor (Duk County).

Summary of 2010 National Assembly of Sudan election in Jonglei
Party	No. of candidates FPTP	Votes FPTP	% of FPTP votes state-wide	FPTP seats won	Party-list vote	% of Party-list vote	Party-list seats won	Women's list vote	% of Women's list vote	Women's list seats won	Total number of seats won
Sudan People's Liberation Movement	9	148,876	75.37%	8	108,133	74.20%	2	110,877	71.03%	4	14
National Congress Party	8	30,976	15.68%	1							1
Sudan African National Union	3	8,086	4.09%								
United Democratic Front	3	5,777	2.92%								
Union of Sudan African Parties	1	3,006	1.52%								
Sudan People's Liberation Movement–Democratic Change	1	807	0.41%								
Independents	3	10,014	5.07%								
Total				9			2			4	15

Source: In the case of the Proportional representation lists, only lists winning seats have their voting tally specified.

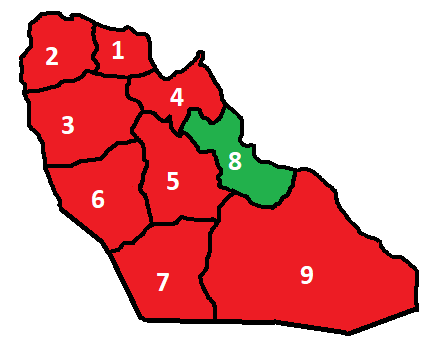
National Assembly constituencies in Jonglei state for the 2010 Sudanese general election. Constituencies in red won by SPLM, in green won by NCP.

Summary of the 2010 National Assembly of Sudan election in the geographic constituencies of Jonglei
No.	Counties	Winning candidate	SPLM	NCP	SANU	UDF	USAP	SPLM-DC	Ind.	Total valid votes per constituency
1	Pigi	Kuol Lual Awuol (SPLM)	14,423	7,727						22,150
2	Old Fangak	John Badeng Chan (SPLM)	5,696	4,906		2,513		807		13,115
3	Ayod	Jacob Duany Waw (SPLM)	2,441	412		2,227			817	5,080
4	Nyirol	Michael Ruot Koryom (SPLM)	5,535	4,944		1,037	3,006			14,522
5	Uror	Michael Chot Lul (SPLM)	15,216	2,858	4,812				9,197	22,886
6	Twic East, Duk	Atem Garang Deng (SPLM)	Acclamation							N/A
7	Bor South	Maker Thiong Maal (SPLM)	60,948	3,038						63,986
8	Akobo	Riek Gai Kok (NCP)	4,716	5,256	1,001					10,973
9	Pibor, Pochalla	Lawuryen Ibon Korlem (SPLM)	39,901	1,835	2,273					44,009
Total			148,876	30,976	8,086	5,777	3,006	807	10,014	196,721

Source: In the 5th constituency, there were two different independent candidates, whose votes are combined in the table above.

=== President of Southern Sudan ===
Candidate	Party	Votes	%
Salva Kiir	Sudan People's Liberation Movement	234,897	93.82
Lam Akol Ajawin	Sudan People's Liberation Movement–Democratic Change	15,486	6.18
Total		250,383	100.00
Registered voters/turnout		595,901	–

=== Southern Sudan Legislative Assembly ===
Jonglei elected 17 deputies from First-past-the-post single member constituencies, 4 deputies from Party-list proportional representation vote and 7 deputies from Women's list vote (also Party-list proportional representation). SPLM won all the Southern Sudan Legislative Assembly seats, except the 6th legislative constituency were independent candidate Timothy Taban Juch defeated the SPLM candidate and incumbent Southern Sudan Minister for Energy and Mining John Luk Jok.

Summary of 2010 Southern Sudan Legislative Assembly election in Jonglei
Party	No. of candidates FPTP	Votes FPTP	% of FPTP votes state-wide	FPTP seats won	Party-list vote	% of Party-list vote	Party-list seats won	Women's list vote	% of Women's list vote	Women's list seats won	Total number of seats won
Sudan People's Liberation Movement	16	172,111	68.44%	15	107,120	72.44%	7	104,610	70.88%	4	26
National Congress Party	10	8,875	3.53%								
United Salvation Front	1	7,941	3.16%								
Union of Sudan African Parties	1	3,750	1.49%								
Democratic Front of South Sudan	1	2,456	0.98%								
United Democratic Front	1	1,886	0.75%								
Sudan African National Union	1	1,068	0.42%								
Original United Democratic Salvation Front	1	128	0.05%								
Independents	13	53,236	21.17%	1							1
Total				16			7			4	27 (Note: Missing 1 seat.)

Source: Data from 16 out of 17 constituencies, missing constituency no. 12 (Duk). In the case of the Proportional representation lists, only lists winning seats have their voting tally specified.

Summary of the 2010 Southern Sudan Legislative Assembly election in the geographic constituencies of Jonglei
Constituency	Name	Winning candidate	SPLM	NCP	USF	USAP	DFSS	UDF	SANU	OUDSF	Ind.	Total:
1	Old Fangak	James Kok Ruey (SPLM)	4,401	3,257					1,068		2,705	11,431
2	Pigi Khorfulus	Gier Choung Aloung (SPLM)	13,134	841							7,004	20,979
3	Ayod North	Timothy Tot Chol (SPLM)	1,061	481							307	1,849
4	Ayod South	Paul Gatnor Ruot (SPLM)	1,935					1,096			1,273	4,304
5	Akobo North	John Jok Chol (SPLM)	3,269	1,049			2,465	790			526	8,099
6	Akobo South	Timothy Taban Juch (Ind.)	2,243							128	2,584	4,955
7	Pochalla	David Okwer Akweny (SPLM)	15,529	166								15,695
8	Nyirol	Kutin Bayak Gil (SPLM)	8,488								6,021	14,509
9	Uror North	Simon Hoth Dual (SPLM)	5,991								5,246	11,237
10	Uror South	Barnaba Marial Benjamin (SPLM)	14,047								5,115	19,162
11	Twic East	Deng Dau Deng (SPLM)	29,395	469							19,661	49,525
13	Bor Athoc	Dengtiel Ayuen Kur (SPLM)	17,584	185		3,750						21,519
14	Bor Central	Michael Makuei Lueth (SPLM)	15,200	650							2,794	18,644
15	Bor Gok	Benjamin Malek Alier (SPLM)	20,278	815								21,093
16	Pibor West	Francis Lokurunga Angou (SPLM)	11,681		7,941							19,622
17	Pibor East	David Aruk Irer (SPLM)	7,875	962								8,837
Total			172,111	8,875	7,941	3,750	2,465	1,886	1,068	128	53,236	251,460

Source: Data from 16 out of 17 constituencies, missing constituency no. 12 (Duk).

=== Governor of Jonglei ===
In the gubernatorial election the incumbent caretaker governor Kuol Manyang Juuk of SPLM faced independent candidate George Athor Deng and Joseph Duer Jakor of the National Congress Party. Both Kuol Manyang and George Athor were from the Dinka tribe. At the 10 January 2010 State SPLM Electoral College, five leaders had expressed their interested in the gubernatorial nomination of the party, and were ranked by the State SPLM Electoral College in the following order: Kuol Manyang, George Athor, Rambang Luoth, Ismail Konyi and Duoth Nhial Pec.

Candidate	Party	Votes	%
Kuol Manyang Juuk	Sudan People's Liberation Movement	165,307	66.22
George Athor Deng	Independent	67,639	27.09
Joseph Duer Jakor	National Congress Party	16,704	6.69
Total		249,650	100.00
Registered voters/turnout		595,901	–

Whilst George Athor refused to acknowledge Kuol Manyang's victory, the NCP candidate Joseph Duer called Kuol Manyang to congratulate him on winning the poll.

=== Jonglei State Legislative Assembly ===
29 state legislators were elected from First-past-the-post single member constituencies, 7 state legislators from Party-list proportional representation vote and 14 state legislators from Women's list vote (also Party-list proportional representation). The United Democratic Front candidate William Mayian Roak won the 5th legislative constituency (Ayod North) and independent candidate Peter Mabior Bol won the 15th legislative constituency (Uror North-East) seat. All other single-member legislative seats were won by SPLM candidates. Joyce James Konyi (UDF) and Martha Chol Luak (NCP) were the only non-SPM candidates elected from the Women's List vote. Duoth Koang Rueh (UDF) was the sole non-SPLM candidate election on the Party-List vote.

==== Athoc North rerun ====
In the 27th state legislature constituency (Athoc North in Bor County) independent candidate Kuol Bol Ayom had requested a re-run, as ballots had been missprinted. Kuol Bol's supported claimed that the National Election Commission had committed fraud by not allocating the correct election symbol to him on the ballot paper. On 15 April 2010 the National Election Commission ordered a re-run of the vote in the 27th state legislature constituency. However, on 18 April 2010 Kuol Bol sent a letter asking the National Election Commission to annul the decision for a re-run, arguing that he had withdrawn his complaint. Nevertheless, a re-run of the elections for the 27th state legislature seat was held in June 2010. Kuol Bol won the seat, obtaining 9,448 votes against 3,387 votes for the SPLM candidate Daniel Deng Kut. The two other candidates in the 27th constituency race, Buol Lual (independent) and Mayen Kur (NCP), had withdrawn from the race but still appeared on the ballot papers and each got less than 50 votes combined.

== Aftermath ==
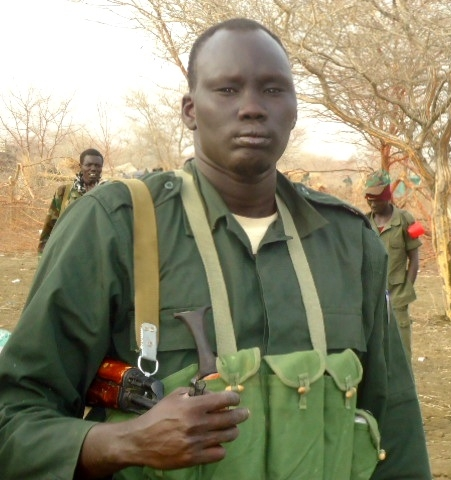
David Yau Yau

Violence in Jonglei continued to prevail after the holding of the elections. Following the announcement of the results, the defeated gubernatorial candidate George Athor charged the SPLM with rigging the vote, went into hiding and launched an armed insurgency. Another armed insurgency emerged led by David Yau Yau, who had lost the vote for the South Pibor seat in the Jonglei State Legislative Assembly.

On 5 August 2010 the Jonglei State Legislative Assembly voted 30 to 2 to dismiss the Pigi South legislator-elect John Agany, who had never appeared in the assembly after the election. John Agany was rumoured to have joined George Athor's insurgency.

== See also ==
- 2010 Sudanese gubernatorial elections
- 2010 Darfurian amalgamation referendum
- 2011 Southern Sudanese independence referendum
