= George Athor's rebellion =

2010-2011 uprising in South Sudan

- Part of the factional violence in South Sudan
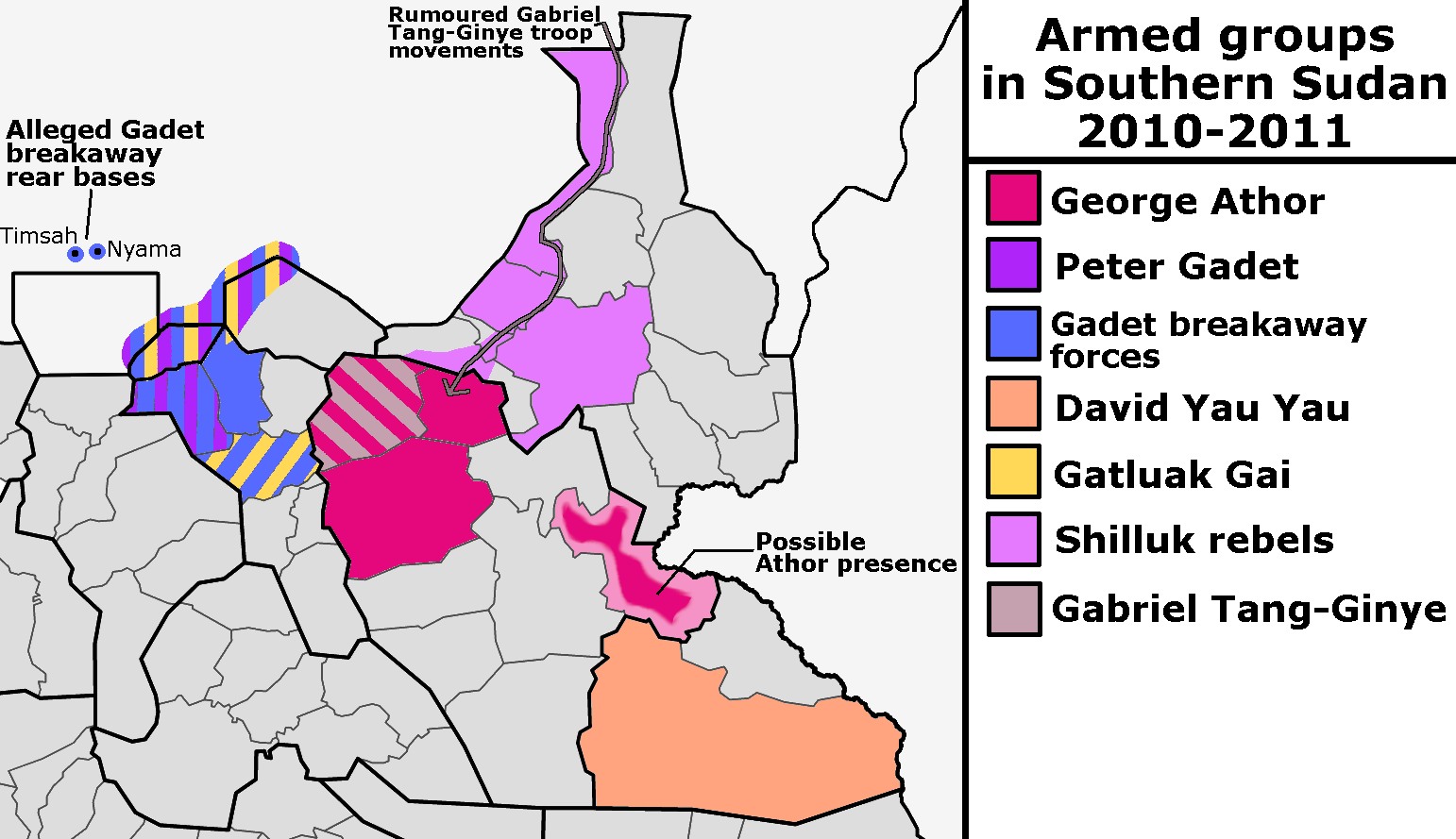
- Map showing insurgencies in northeastern South Sudan from 2010 to 2011. Areas affected by George Athor's rebellion in red.
Date	30 April 2010 – 19 December 2011 (1 year, 7 months, 2 weeks and 5 days)
Location	Northeastern South Sudan (part of Sudan's Southern Sudan Autonomous Region until July 2011)
Result	South Sudanese government victory

Belligerents
South Sudan Democratic Movement (SSDM); Gabriel Tanginye's militia Supported by: Sudan; Eritrea (alleged); EUPF (alleged)	South Sudan (Southern Sudan Autonomous Region until July 2011)

Commanders and leaders
George Athor †; Gabriel Tanginye (surrendered)	Abraham Thiong Ajang

Units involved
SSDM/A: George Athor's private army; Various tribal militias (loosely); Gabriel Tanginye's militia	Sudan People's Liberation Army (SPLA); South Sudan Police Service; Wildlife wardens

Strength
2,000–Thousands	Unclear

Casualties and losses
- At least hundreds killed

George Athor's rebellion was an uprising in the Southern Sudan Autonomous Region (later the independent South Sudan) which lasted from April 2010 to December 2011. Organized by South Sudanese military commander and politician George Athor, the conflict mainly took place in the states of Upper Nile and Jonglei as well as some border areas.

The rebellion was launched by Athor when he was defeated in the 2010 South Sudanese general election, rejecting the results and using his private army to battle the government. He eventually organized the South Sudan Democratic Movement (SSDM), an alliance of various rebel leaders, though the insurgents' actual cooperation remained very limited and Athor continued to wage his insurgency largely on his own. Over the course of the conflict, Athor rejected a number of deals offered by the government, and a ceasefire agreement reached in January 2011 quickly fell apart. The rebel leader was ultimately killed by security forces in December 2011.

== Background ==
Southern Sudan Autonomous Region, part of Sudan until July 2011

From 1983 to 2005, Sudan was affected by a civil war. George Athor, a member of the Padeng sub-clan of the Dinka people, joined the rebel Sudan People's Liberation Army (SPLA) at the conflict's start, serving at various fronts and rising in the ranks over the years. In 2005, the Sudanese government and some rebel groups, including the SPLA, signed the Comprehensive Peace Agreement. This resulted in South Sudan being granted autonomy as the "Southern Sudan Autonomous Region", with the SPLM –the SPLA's political wing– forming the first government of Southern Sudan. The SPLA was reorganized as a regional military, and began to absorb the various other regional militias and rebel factions. An independence referendum was prepared in the south. Athor was subsequently posted to Upper Nile, where he was involved in various factional clashes and gradually promoted until becoming lieutenant general, 8th Division commander in Jonglei, and SPLA deputy chief of staff for political and moral orientation. Athor had a substantial base of support in Jonglei, particularly at Khorfulus County, and within the military. He had reportedly grown wealthy thanks to corruption, and amassed a large amount of additional weaponry for his private army. These extra guns included many confiscated by the SPLA during the disarmament of the Lou Nuer in which Athor had been involved.

For the 2010 South Sudanese general election, Athor resigned from his SPLA position and ran as an independent candidate for the Jonglei governorship. The SPLM disapproved of this move, and backed incumbent governor Kuol Manyang Juuk instead. Athor lost, and –like many other unsuccessful candidates of the election– revolted. At the start of their uprising, Athor's forces were considered the most powerful insurgent group in Southern Sudan. His loyalists included elements of the SPLA's 3rd and 8th Divisions. In addition, Lou and Jikany Nuer youths rallied to his uprising, mostly to gain access to weapons for their own tribal conflicts against the Murle people.

== Rebellion ==
=== Early uprising ===
When Athor's defeat in the election was announced, his forces attacked a SPLA base at Doleib Hill, southwest of the Upper Nile state capital Malakal, on 30 April 2010. This assault resulted in eight deaths. At first, Athor denied that he or his followers were responsible for the Doleib Hill attack, while also claimining that the SPLM had rigged the Jonglei election and harassed his supporters, demanding that Kuol Manyang step down as governor. The South Sudanese government dismissed his accusations and demands. Athor's followers subsequently began to repeatedly clash with government forces in Jonglei. As a skilled commander, Athor quickly gained ground, capturing large parts of Jonglei. He announced the formation of a rebel alliance, the "South Sudan Democratic Movement" (SSDM) with an armed wing called "South Sudan Army" (SSA), and insisted that he was fighting for military and government reforms.

Over time, Athor was able to attract other dissident commanders to his SSDM/A alliance, including Bapiny Monituel in Mayom County, John Uliny and Alyuak Ogot in Upper Nile, Gatluak Gai in Unity State, David Yau Yau in Pibor County. Despite these alignments, the different rebel leaders did little to unite or coordinate their uprisings; most were unwilling to accept anyone but themselves as chief commander. As many of the other rebellions were at least partially driven by ethnic loyalties, Athor also struggled to gain support as he was a Dinka like many members of the government. In addition, his main area of operations was relatively isolated from other insurgent areas. Athor's efforts to create a united rebel force thus failed, and he continued to wage a rebellion largely separate from other SSDM/A members. He also enlarged his private army by arming supportive civilians. By September, he was suspected of hiding near the Ethiopian border. In the next month, Athor's rebels were accused by the SPLA of being responsible of an ambush in Unity State, killing 23 soldiers and policemen.

In October 2010, the government and Athor's force began negotiations. In the same month, South Sudanese President Salva Kiir granted amnesties to several rebel leaders, including Athor, Gatluak Gai, and Gabriel Tanginye. However, the talks soon stalled. In response, Kiir organized a direct meeting of government delegation and Athor at an undisclosed location in late December, but the rebel leader did not attend the meeting. Meanwhile, his followers clashed with the SPLA in Pigi County, with up to 20 soldiers killed according to SPLA sources. Athor's refusal to accept a deal reportedly frustrated his allies in the SPLA.

=== Post-2011 South Sudanese independence referendum ===
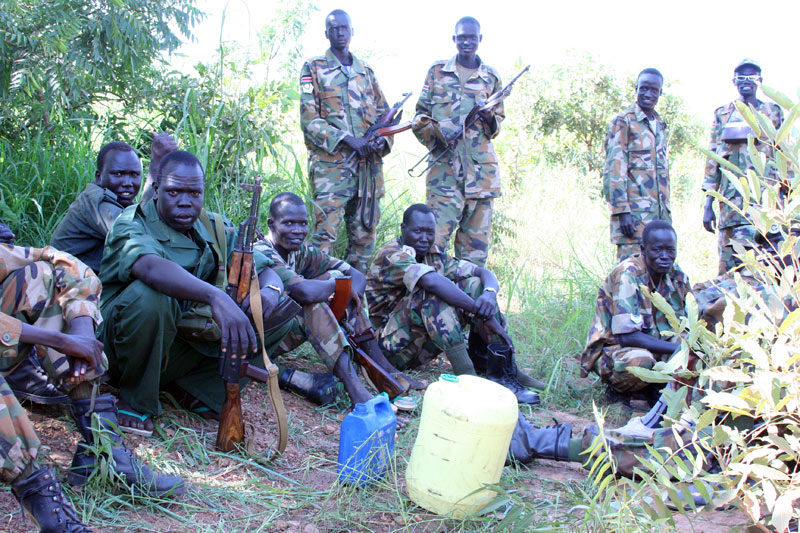
Sudan People's Liberation Army (SPLA) fighters in 2009

Just before the South Sudanese independence referendum, however, the government was able to reach an agreement with Athor. On 5 January 2011, a ceasefire was signed by representatives of both sides in Juba, overseen by South Sudanese Vice-president Riek Machar. Even though the agreement included a timetable for the reintegration of Athor's force into the SPLA, it did not solve all issues. One key point of contention was the rank which would be granted to Athor upon his return to the SPLA. Members of the military were dissatisfied with the ceasefire's terms and blocked Athor when he attempted to travel to Juba, and though the ceasefire held during the independence referendum from 9 to 15 January, fighting resumed afterward.

Heavy clashes between the SSDM/A and the SPLA took place in Fangak County on 9–10 February. Both sides blamed each other for the clashes. Athor claimed that the government army had attacked his contingents at Dor, Koliet, and Kolnyang in Fangak, places where his rebels has assembled to wait for their integration into the military. According to Athor, his forces had "pursued" the SPLA attackers after repelling the initial attack, resulting in a battle at the county headquarters of New Fangak. In contrast, the SPLA claimed that the insurgents had struck first by assaulting Dor and Fangak, killing policemen, prison guards, wildlife wardens, and civilians as well as temporarily capturing New Fangak. According to this version of events, the SPLA had counter-attacked to retake the seized areas. Local officials reported that the fighting led to at least 200 deaths and 400 people being wounded.

Later, clashes also took place at Diel (near Dor) and Atar (50 km southeast of Malakal). Another regional dissident commander, Gabriel Tanginye, reportedly allied with Athor around this time; his forces subsequently began to clash with the SPLA in Fangak County. On 27 February, heavy fighting erupted at three locations in Fangak; three weeks later, the SPLA overran Athor's hideout in Pigi County. The rebels subsequently retreated toward the Ethiopian border. On 7 March, another battle took place in Pigi County; the result of this clash was disputed: Athor claimed that the SSDM/A had captured several SPLA tanks, while the SPLA claimed that it had captured several rebel bases in the area. In April 2011, Gabriel Tanginye and his militia surrendered to the SPLA; he was subsequently placed under house arrest in Juba. In the next month, Athor armed 1,000 Gawaar Nuer and Padeng Dinka youths for their own conflict with the Murle; in return, the militants promised to aid his operations. Ultimately, the youths renegaded on the deal. In June and July, SSDM/A commanders Gai and Yau Yau signed their own agreements with the government.

In September and October, there were clashes between Athor's followers and the SPLA in Ayod County. Athor's attempts to bolster his forces during this fighting by enlisting local youths again failed, as the new recruits instead retreated with their guns. By November 2011, Athor's forces had been largely dislodged from northern Jonglei, though they still maintained some presence in the counties of Ayod, Fangak, Pigi and possibly Akobo. His influence in Akobo had greatly declined, however, as many Luo Nuer militants had split from his forces in order to protect their homes from attacks by Murle militias. Despite these setbacks, Athor remained adamant regarding his demands for any deal with the South Sudanese government, conditioning an end of the uprising on "new elections, the release of political detainees, and the selection of a third party to enforce any future peace agreement with the government". As these conditions were not met, negotiations between his forces and the government made no progress.

On 19 December 2011, Athor was killed by the SPLA, reportedly when he attempted to enter South Sudan's Central Equatoria from Uganda or the Democratic Republic of the Congo. According to Vice President Machar, Athor had attempted to recruit new members for the SSDM/A in the region, but SPLA border guards had encountered the rebel leader's group in Morobo County, opened fire, and killed him and one other insurgent. The South Sudanese government stated that it had not intended to kill Athor, whereas the SSDM/A accused Kiir's government of having previously attempted to assassinate the rebel leader.

== Role of foreign forces ==
Despite the Comprehensive Peace Agreement of 2005, the Sudanese government continued to covertly support and supply several militias which were opposed to the government of the Southern Sudan Autonomous Region and later independent South Sudan, thereby encouraging a number of rebellions in the south. The South Sudanese government thus quickly began accusing Athor of being supported by the Sudanese government, a claim initially described as lacking independent evidence and unlikely by Small Arms Survey researchers. However, evidence of Sudanese support in the form of new weapons captured from Athor's rebels were surfacing over the course of the rebellion. It was eventually confirmed that Athor had been in frequent contact with the Sudanese government which had smuggled arms to him; in one incident, a Sudan Airways helicopter had been used for this purpose. Despite this support, Sudan Tribune journalist Steve Paterno argued that the Sudanese government had also not been interested in allowing Athor to create a functioning rebel alliance, as several smaller rebel groups were easier to manipulate. Paterno identified this as one of the reasons for the SDDM/A's failure.

In addition, Athor travelled to Eritrea at least three times in 2010 and 2011; it is possible that the Eritrean government subsequently began to also supply him. There were also unverified claims about Athor being supplied with weaponry by the Ethiopian Unity Patriots Front (EUPF) during his rebellion.

== Aftermath ==
Athor was succeeded by Peter Kuol Chol Awan as the leader of the SSDM/A; Awan and 1,800 of his fighters surrendered to the SPLA in February 2012. Some SSDM/A factions, like Uliny's and a minority of Athor's former followers, continued their resistance, and others –such as Yau Yau's– later resumed their rebellions. Factional and ethnic violence as well as warlord rebellions continued to affect South Sudan. Politically unstable, the country descended into another civil war in late 2013.
