= 2021 Gumuruk and Likuangole attacks =

- Part of Ethnic violence in South Sudan
- Greater Pibor Administrative Area, where Gumuruk and Likuangole are located
- Location: Gumuruk, Likuangole, and Verteth, Greater Pibor Administrative Area, South Sudan
- Date: May 7–13, 2021
- Target: Murle civilians
- Deaths: 55 (per IOM, May 2021); 68 (per U.N.); 150+ (per Konyi)
- Injuries: 19 (per IOM, May 2021); 27 (per U.N.)
- Victims: 34 kidnapped 80,000 displaced
- Perpetrators: Gawaar Nuer and Bor Dinka militiamen

On May 7 and 13, 2021, Gawaar Nuer and Bor Dinka militiamen attacked Murle communities in Gumuruk and Likuangole, Greater Pibor Administrative Area, South Sudan. At least 80,000 people were displaced to Pibor as a result of the attacks. At least 55 people were killed in the attacks.

== Background ==
Conflicts around land and cattle-raiding have been commonplace in Jonglei State and the Greater Pibor Administrative Area for decades, mainly between the Bor Dinka, Lou Nuer and Gawaar Nuer in Jonglei and Murle in the GPAA. In 2020, despite the end of the South Sudanese Civil War, a war broke out between Bor Dinka, Lou Nuer, and Gawaar Nuer against Murle militiamen in Jonglei and the GPAA. The war ended due to heavy flooding in August 2020, and at least 150,000 people, mostly Murle, were displaced.

During this war, Gawaar Nuer and Bor Dinka militiamen attacked Murle areas in the towns of Likuangole and Gumuruk, killing hundreds of civilians. Despite some periodic clashes in June and August, these areas were largely peaceful after spring 2020. The town of Pibor was unaffected in the 2020 war.

== Attacks ==
The attacks first began on May 7, 2021, in remote communities along the Nanaam river in Likuangole payam. The Gawaar Nuer and Bor Dinka attacked in retaliation for Murle raids in Jonglei. These militants had come from Ayod County, Uror County, and Duk County. Thousands of people fled villages along the river, many of these communities being the same communities attacked in the first month of the 2020 war. On May 10, the Gawaar Nuer and Bor Dinka militiamen attacked the town of Gumuruk, which only had a small number of its pre-war inhabitants. During the sacking of the town, warehouses holding food aid and other humanitarian supplies were ransacked. All humanitarian aid was forced to cease. Over the next three days, about 19,000 people fled Gumuruk. The Nuer militants then began attacking communities in Verteth between May 11 and 13, raiding cattle there. After raiding Verteth, the militants returned to Jonglei.

Many of the displaced residents fled to Pibor town, where Murle armed groups were walking around openly. After May 13, Murle militants slowly began regaining control of Gumuruk and the surrounding towns that had been attacked. On May 23, the IOM reported that between five and ten households were returning to Gumuruk every day, and that many young men could be seen scouting if it was safe for their families to return. At the height of the fighting, 80,000 people had been displaced to Pibor, which only had a population of 1,000. At least 55 people had been killed in the attacks, 19 wounded, 34 women and children abducted, and over 300 homes destroyed, according to a May 2021 report. The administrator of the GPAA, Joshua Konyi, said that 150 Murle people were killed, but the U.N. said in 2021 that 68 were killed and 21 were injured.

== Aftermath ==
Konyi was fired as administrator of the GPAA following the attacks. The SSPDF's Murle Eagle Battalion, implicated in funneling arms and participating in Murle attacks in the 2020 war, was disbanded.

UNMISS deployed peacekeepers to Gumuruk after the attacks.
