= Ethiopian Unity Patriots Front =

Political party and militant rebel organization in Ethiopia

- EUPF membership card, showcasing the organization's logos in the left and right corner
- Leader: Thowath Pal Chay
- Dates active: c. 1993 – present
- Headquarters: South Sudan
- Ideology: Ethiopian nationalism Anti-ethnic federalism Democracy; Nuer tribalism
- Part of: Ethiopian People's Patriotic Front
- Wars: the conflicts in the Horn of Africa, and the South Sudanese Civil War

The Ethiopian Unity Patriots Front (abbreviated EUPF) is a political party and militant rebel organization that waged an insurgency against the Ethiopian government from 1993 to 2012. Formed by ex-officials of the Derg regime, the EUPF was mostly active in Ethiopia's Gambela Region as well as eastern Sudan and South Sudan. The group agreed to a ceasefire with the Ethiopian government in 2012, and officially ended its insurgency in 2016. The EUPF remains active, however, and its armed wing has reportedly been involved in the South Sudanese Civil War, although to what extent is disputed.

== Name ==
Officially called the "Ethiopian Unity Patriots Front" (abbreviated "EUPF"), the organization is also known by a variety of similar names, including "Ethiopian Unity Patriotic Front", "Ethiopian United Patriotic Front" and "Ethiopian Patriotic United Front" ("EPUF"). The EUPF's armed wing is named "Ethiopian Unity Patriots Army".

== History ==
=== Foundation and early activity ===
The Ethiopian Unity Patriots Front was founded by ethnic Nuer ex-officials of Mengistu Haile Mariam's Derg regime. The rebel group's chairman, Thowath Pal Chay, was a ranking member of the Derg. He had served as Illubabor Province's governor in the 1980s, the province's security chief from 1981 to 1985, as Workers' Party secretary between 1985 and 1987, and as First Secretary for Western Ethiopia as well as member of both the National Security Defense Council and the National Assembly from 1987. At the time, he forged links with the Sudan People's Liberation Movement (SPLM), a separatist rebel group active in neighboring Sudan. When Mengistu Haile Mariam's regime collapsed in 1991 as result of the Ethiopian Civil War, Pal fled abroad. He eventually settled in Kenya, and gathered several other former officials of the Derg to organize a rebellion against the new Ethiopian government under Meles Zenawi. The EUPF began its struggle around 1993.

Meles's government consequently designated the group as terrorist organisation. One alleged EUPF member, Assefa Maru, was killed by Ethiopian security forces in Addis Ababa in May 1997. Assefa had been active in the Ethiopian Teachers' Association (ETA) as well as the Ethiopian Human Rights Association, both civil organizations known for being critical of Meles. Though the government claimed that Assefa had resisted arrest during a raid on ETA offices, and secretly hoarded weapons, opposition groups and human rights organizations condemned Assefa's death. Some even claimed that he had been outright murdered, and that weapons had been planted by security forces in the ETA offices as cover-up.

=== Insurgency in Ethiopia ===
Gambela Region (red) was the center of the EUPF's insurgency in Ethiopia

Originally based in Sudan, the EUPF started a full insurgency in western Ethiopia, most importantly in Gambela Region, in the late 1990s. From this point onward, it repeatedly managed to seize villages along the Ethiopian-Sudanese border amid heavy clashes with the Ethiopian military. The group allied itself with Eritrea, and was consequently provided with bases, weapons, and training by the Eritrean military. The EUPF joined the Eritrean-backed Ethiopian People's Patriotic Front rebel alliance in 2000, and was able to capture and hold Akobo in western Gambela in the same year. The group then expanded its operations, intervening in the Oromo conflict and attempting to ally with another Ethiopian rebel faction, the Oromo Liberation Front.

The Ethiopian military launched an offensive to retake Akobo from the EUPF in August 2004, but this operation initially failed to make progress due to the difficult terrain. Instead, the EUPF rebels even expanded their territorial control by launching successful counter-attacks and rallying local Nuer tribesmen to their cause. The Eritrean Air Force supported the rebels in Akobo by transporting newly trained insurgent troops from Eritrea into Gambela Region. The EUPF consequently launched forays into Kaffa Province and southern Oromia Region, but these were only very limited in scope due to lack of support by civilians for the EUPF outside of Gambela. In the following years, the EUPF lost its territories and declined as military force.

Over time, several peace talks between the EUPF and the Ethiopian government took place, mediated by South Sudan, Uganda, and Kenya. Most of these failed before the rebel group agreed to a ceasefire in 2012. By 2015, the EUPF was "inactive militarily" in Ethiopia, and instead tried to achieve its goals through political activism. An 8-point peace agreement was signed in November 2016. Pal subsequently stated that the EUPF had ended its armed struggle, and that the EUPF fighters based in Sudan and Eritrea would peacefully return to Ethiopia. This deal was later criticised by elements of the EUPF who claimed that Pal had decided to agree before sufficiently consulting the rest of the rebel leadership. Pal relocated to and consequently began working in Ethiopia's capital Addis Ababa.

=== Activity in Sudan and South Sudan ===
While the EUPF had unsuccessfully attempted to overthrow the Ethiopian government, Thowath Pal Chay's old allies of the Sudan People's Liberation Movement had managed to achieve South Sudan's independence from Sudan in 2011. Numerous SPLM splinter groups and rebel factions continued to be active in the country, however, fighting the new South Sudanese government under President Salva Kiir. One of these was the South Sudan Democratic Movement under former Sudan People's Liberation Army general George Athor who had launched a rebellion in 2010. By 2011, Athor reportedly bought arms from the EUPF in Jonglei. This could not be independently confirmed. His revolt collapsed after he was killed in December 2011, but two years later, a full civil war broke out between President Kiir and Vice President Riek Machar who formed the SPLM/A-IO rebel movement. There have been various allegations that the EUPF has been involved in this conflict, fighting for Kiir's government against Machar's forces.

Even though the EUPF has denied armed intervention in the South Sudanese Civil War, and has urged for the civil war parties to come to an understanding, it is known to be hostile toward Machar due to his alleged support for the Ethiopian government. Furthermore, the EUPF has admitted that it is supported by Kiir's government. According to the SPLM/A-IO, Ethiopian rebel troops under Thowath Pal Chay aided a South Sudanese government offensive in the Upper Nile region in early 2015. Pal dismissed these claims, stating that he was "not interested in killing among brothers who fought for their freedom with our support". He remained critical of Machar, however, and blamed the latter's rebellion for the increase in tribal violence in Gambela Region in February 2016.

South Sudanese intelligence officials reportedly arrested six EUPF members in May 2017, accusing them of being involved in illegal arms trade with South Sudanese Mathiang Anyoor militias. Thowath Pal Chay claimed that EUPF spokesman Pal Ojulu was responsible for the arrests. Ojulu responded by accusing Thowath Pal Chay of being behind these illegal deals, and of arming Anuak youths to prepare a new insurgency against the Ethiopian government. In late 2017, Pal accused the SPLM/A-IO of recruiting Ethiopians into their ranks and Riak of increasing regional tensions, while "fighting for destruction of South Sudan". A SPLM/A-IO spokesman denied these claims, and in response accused the EUPF of cooperating with Kiir's government.

== Organization ==
General Thowath Pal Chay acts as the EUPF's chairman and commander-in-chief, and also serves as member of the group's leadership council. Colonel Pal Ojulu is the official spokesman. Since 2012, disputes have emerged between Thowath Pal Chay and the other commanders of the EUPF about the former's style of leadership.

== Ideology ==
The EUPF has claimed to "believe in democracy and the rule of law", and stated that its intention is to ensure a unitary, peaceful, and an inclusionist Ethiopia. Pal has affirmed that his forces are vehemently opposed to the ethnic federalisation of Ethiopia under Zenawi, and the separation of Ethiopia and Eritrea. He has reasoned that federalism was problematic, as "some Ethiopians, nowadays, [...] don't consider themselves as Ethiopians. They consider themselves as ethnic communities of their own areas", leading to ethnic tensions and violence.

Despite its official opposition to sectarianism, the EUPF is "purely a Nuer affair", and is generally fighting for Nuer interests. It rallied only a very small number of fighters from other ethnic groups to its cause during its insurgency. Most importantly, Eritrea provided some Oromo, Amhara and Tigrean recruits to the EUPF in 2004, and the rebel group also had a few militant Anuak among its ranks at the time.
