= Duk Payuel massacre =

2017 massacre in Jonglei, South Sudan

- Part of Ethnic violence in South Sudan
- Location: 7.2858°N 31.3058°E; Duk Payel, Duk County, Jonglei South Sudan
- Date: 28 November 2017; 8 years ago
- Deaths: 69 killed
- Injuries: 19 injured
- Victims: 60 abducted
- Perpetrator: Murle youth from Boma State

The Duk Payel massacre occurred in Jonglei, South Sudan, on November 28, 2017, when a group of Murle youths attacked a Bor Dinka village in Duk County. The attack resulted in 69 casualties and 19 injuries. It was a part of bigger hostilities between the two ethnic groups.

== Background ==
After the independence from Sudan in 2011, South Sudan fell in to a civil war between the government and opposition forces led by Riek Machar. The civil war lasted five years from 2013 to 2018 and was marred by massacres and ethnic violence. Due to the civil war, the country became oversaturated with small arms and violent encounters like cattle raids increased significantly. In January 2012, Mutineering Murle soldiers attacked Duk county, killing at least 85 people and leading to the displacement of over 20,000 civilians. The attacks were connected to cattle raiding, as the attacking Murle stole around 504 heads of cattle during the attack. In 2016 revenge attacks, cattle raids and child abductions increased in Jonglei between the Murle and Bor Dinka. Despite a cessation of hostilities agreement being signed in May, the attacks worsened, with around 280 people being killed in August 2017 during attacks in Duk county.

== Massacre ==
On the morning of November 28, 2017, Murle youth from the neighboring Boma state launched an attack against the village of Duk Payel. During the attack, the Murle youth burned houses, abducted children and women, and stole cattle. According to the Jonglei state information minister Jacob Akec Dengdit, the attack killed around 45 civilians including 22 women, 17 men and a newborn. United Nations Mission in South Sudan (UNMISS) stated that around 60 women and children had been abducted during the attack.

== Aftermath ==
Week after the attack South Sudan's Information Minister Michael Makuei Lueth stated that the number of the victims had rose from 40 to 69. Makuei also stated that the stolen cattle had been recovered by the youth living in the village. The South Sudanese government strongly condemned the attack and called on the villagers to "give peace a chance so that we see how best this situation will be addressed”. UNMISS representative David Shearer condemned the attack on innocent civilians and urged the leaders of both communities "to reign in the youth, show restraint and to put an end to the cycle of revenge killings".
