= Eritrea–South Sudan relations =

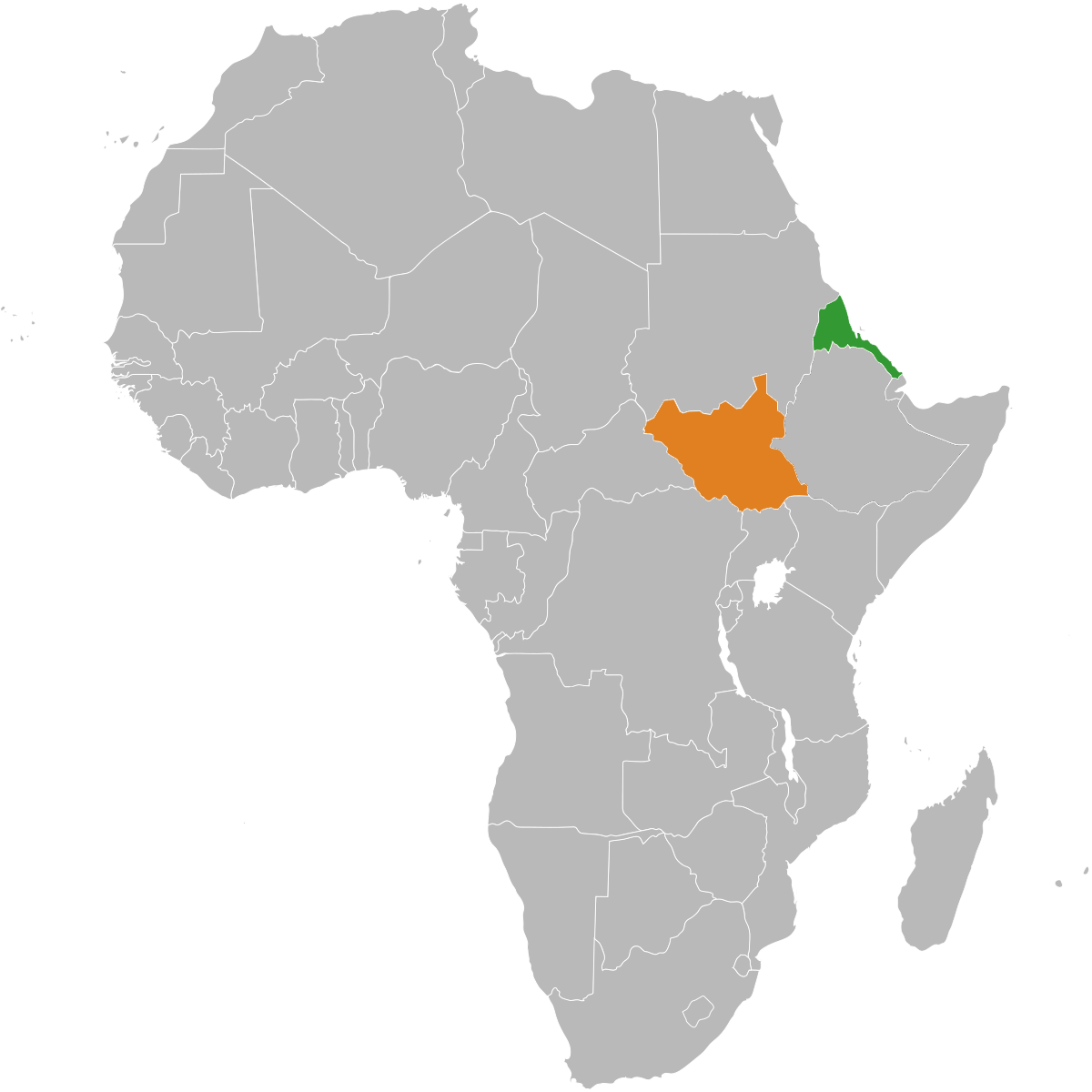

- Eritrea: South Sudan

Relations between Eritrea and South Sudan refer to relations between the State of Eritrea and the Republic of South Sudan. Prior to the independence of South Sudan, Eritrea provided support for South Sudanese rebel groups who fought in the Second Sudanese Civil War. During the South Sudanese Civil War, the Eritrean government worked with South Sudanese officials during the peace process.

== History ==
=== Pre-independence (pre-2011) ===
Prior to South Sudan's independence, Eritrea provided support to South Sudanese rebel groups at various points during the Second Sudanese Civil War. Paul Makuei, who went on to become South Sudan's ambassador to Eritrea post-independence, stated in 2015 that:

"Eritrea is a very important country to us as South Sudanese and as government, considering the support we have had from the government and people of Eritrea during the struggle."

A 2011 report from a United Nations Monitoring Group found that Eritrea had supported George Athor and Peter Gadet, leaders of the SPLA.

=== Post-independence (2011-present) ===
After South Sudan became independent of Sudan on 9 July 2011, Eritrea formally recognized the country on 11 July 2011. In 2012, South Sudanese officials announced the country would try to mediate the border dispute between Eritrea and Ethiopia. Deng Alor Kuol, South Sudan's foreign affairs minister, told Reuters that South Sudan has "close ties with both countries".

Isaias Afwerki, the President of Eritrea, stressed Eritrea's support for South Sudan in 2018, stating:

"The people of Eritrea will stand, as ever, on the side of, and in solidarity with, the people of South Sudan until and beyond the achievement of the mission of liberation"

==== Role in South Sudanese Civil War ====
In 2014, American human rights activist John Prendergast accused Eritrea of supporting rebels led by Riek Machar and David Yau Yau in the South Sudanese Civil War, who fought the Juba government. The Eritrean government denied these claims, as did representatives of the rebel delegation. A representative of Eritrea's government called the claims a "preposterous lie", and stated that Eritrea had also been falsely accused of supporting Sudan in the 2012 Heglig Crisis.

Eritrean President Afwerki and Ethiopian Prime Minister Abiy Ahmed traveled to South Sudan in 2019 to assist the South Sudanese in securing a peace deal in the civil war. In 2022, Eritrea and Sudan were asked to help mediate the South Sudanese peace process by speaking to holdout rebel groups.
