= Gabriel Lam =

Gabriel Lam may refer to:

- Gabriel Lam (priest), Hong Kong Catholic priest
- Gabriel Duop Lam, South Sudanese politician
- Gabriel Lam (Singaporean politician), Singaporean politician
