= David Yau Yau =

South Sudanese militant and politician

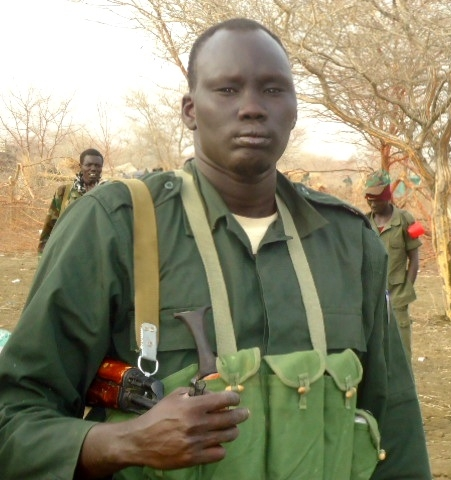
- Yau Yau during his time as insurgent leader

Chief Administrator of Greater Pibor
- In office 2014–2015
- Preceded by: Position established
- Succeeded by: Position abolished

Governor of Boma State
- In office 2018–2020
- Preceded by: Baba Medan Konya
- Succeeded by: Position abolished

Personal details
- Party: Sudan People's Liberation Movement
- Other political affiliations: South Sudan Democratic Movement (until 2016)

David Yau Yau is a South Sudanese politician and former militant. He served as Governor of Boma State from 2018 to 2020 and as the Chief Administrator of the Greater Pibor Administrative Area of South Sudan. He was previously the leader of a Murle insurrection against the South Sudanese government.

== Early life and education ==
Yau Yau studied theology at Emmanuel Christian College in Yei from 2004 to 2006.

== Career ==
In 2010, Yau Yau was employed as County Secretary by the South Sudan Relief and Rehabilitation Commission in Pibor County. Yau Yau ran in the April 2010 Sudanese general election for the Gumuruk Boma seat in the Jonglei State Assembly. The SPLM candidate Judi Jonglei Bioris won by a wide margin. Yau Yau is alternately reported to have been an independent candidate and a member of the United Democratic Front opposition party.

=== Insurgency and leadership of the Greater Pibor Administrative Area ===
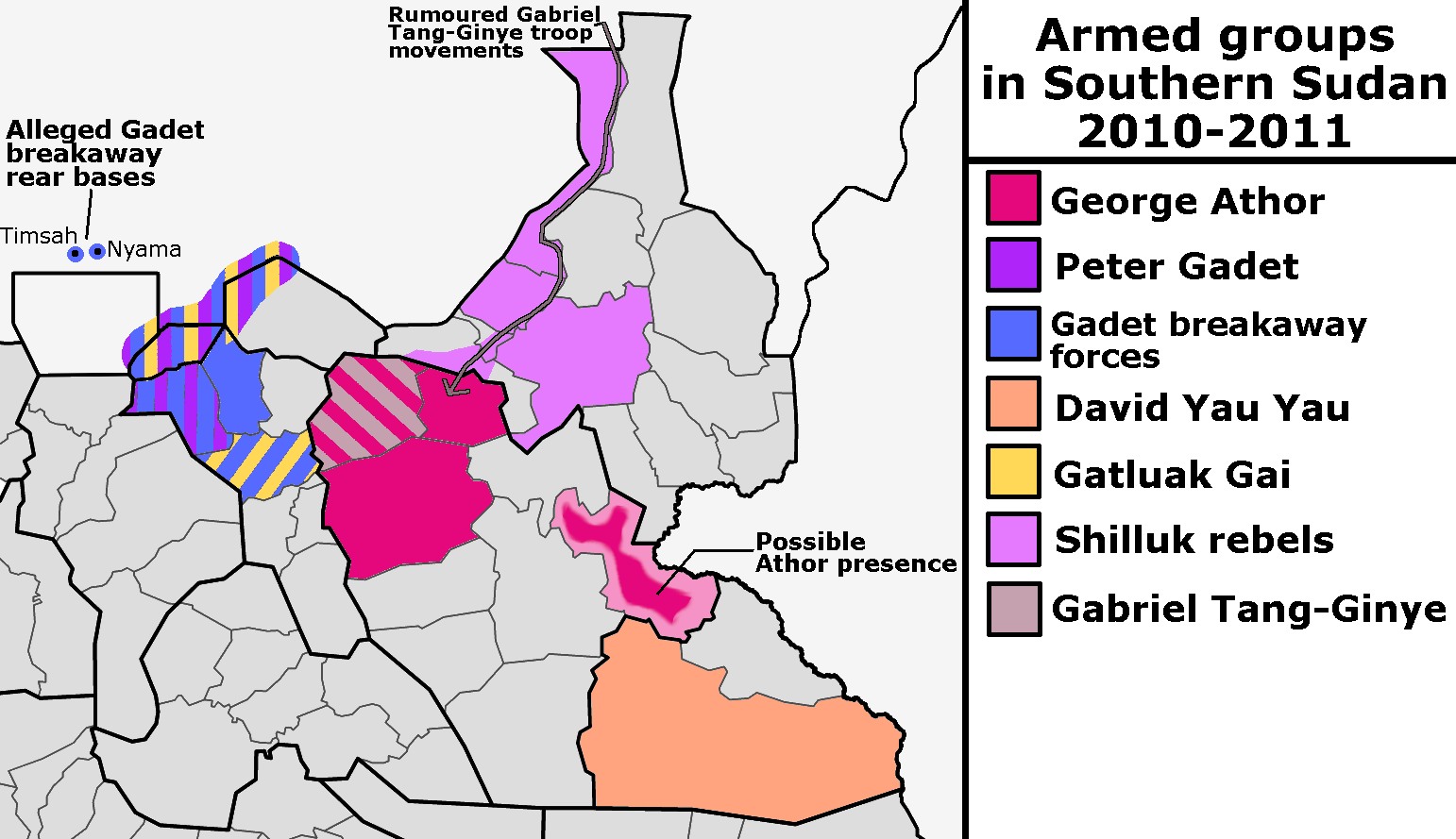
Map showing insurgencies in northeastern South Sudan from 2010 to 2011. Areas affected by Yau Yau's rebellion in orange.

After his failed bid for the state assembly, Yau Yau accused the SPLM of fraud and voter intimidation. On 20 May 2010 he led an armed group in a clash with the SPLA. One casualty was reported by the SPLA. Yau Yau indicated that he was in contact with George Athor, another failed Jonglei candidate who led the South Sudan Democratic Movement (SSDM) into rebellion for similar reasons.

Yau Yau signed a ceasefire with the GoSS in June 2011, which integrated him and his militia with the SPLA. He had the rank of Brigadier General in the SPLA. In April 2012 he defected again, and lead a Murle-dominated militia in the South Sudan internal conflict for several years.

Yau Yau became the head of the Murle insurrection and the militia that he led became known as the "Cobra Faction" of the SSDM. A March 2014 peace accord with the GoSS appointed Yau Yau as the Chief Administrator of a newly established, semi-autonomous Greater Pibor Administrative Area, with virtually the same authority as South Sudan's state governors.

He gave up the leadership of his Cobra Faction which was dissolved after merger with the SPLM-IO-allied Greater Pibor Forces in January 2016. After leaving the post of leader of Cobra Faction, he joined the SPLM with some of his former accomplices.

=== Governor of Boma State and later career ===
In 2018, he was appointed governor of Boma State. Afterwards, the former troops of his private army were transported from Pibor to Juba to be fully integrated into the SPLA. Yau Yau held his governorship until 2020, when Boma State was dissolved. The Greater Pibor Administrative Area was subsequently restored. Yau Yau continued to serve as a National Legislative Assembly member.

In 2022, Yau Yau visited President Kiir's home state of Warrap with several of the president's aides. This was regarded by the news site African Arguments as possibly signalling that Kiir hoped to enlist Yau Yau's support for the 2023 South Sudanese general election.

On October 30, 2023 President Kiir removed Yau Yau from the SPLM Liberation Council and the Transitional National Legislative Assembly. In his announcement to the nation, President Kiir did not give a reason for the dismissal. Yau Yau said that while he had not been consulted on the decision, there was nothing wrong with the decision and that he remained a staunch supporter of the SPLM.

== Corruption ==
David Yau Yau is mentioned in the Enough Project's The Sentry, an initiative designed to gather evidence and analyze the financing and operation of African conflicts. He was accused of profiteering in South Sudan's Civil War by forming an oil company with two British citizens during his governorship of Boma State. He denied the accusation.
