= Emelda Modi Benerato =

South Sudanese politician (died 2021)

Emelda Modi Benerato (died 2021) was a South Sudanese politician.

Emelda Modi hailed from Akobo County. Emelda Modi was appointed member of the National Assembly of Sudan by presidential decree in August 2005. She stood as a National Assembly candidate on the Sudan People's Liberation Movement (SPLM) women's list in Jonglei State in the 2010 elections, and was elected.

After the independence of South Sudan in 2011, the former South Sudanese members of the National Assembly of Sudan were inducted into the National Legislative Assembly of South Sudan. The members of the National Legislative Assembly had their mandates extended in August 2016 as the Transitional National Legislative Assembly was instituted. In May 2021 Emelda Modi was appointed to the Reconstituted Transitional National Legislative Assembly, as a SPLM representative. She died on 22 June 2021 in Khartoum, at the age of 57.
