= Pibor (disambiguation) =

Pibor may refer to:

- Pibor, also called Pibor Post, a town in eastern South Sudan
  - Pibor County
  - Greater Pibor Administrative Area
- The river Pibor, a river in eastern South Sudan
