= 1st Division (South Sudan) =

Division of SPLA

The 1st Division, (South Sudan) of the Sudan People's Liberation Army (SPLA) (alternatively known as Division I) is a division of the SPLA, now being renamed as the South Sudan People's Defence Forces. It was established in 2006, and its headquarters is located in Renk, Upper Nile State.

After the Comprehensive Peace Agreement was signed, George Athor was appointed to the rank of major general in the SPLA when ranks were formalized, and confirmed in overall commander of Division I (2005-07) before being moved to SPLA HQ in Bilpam as director for administration. Rands wrote in 2011 that 'The men at the Ketbek Garrison of Major General Gordon Kong of the SAF largely became SPLA with the 2006 Juba declaration. They took with them most of the equipment held by the SSDF in the area, which had been supplied to them by SAF Military Intelligence. They are now integrated into elements of the 3rd Brigade of the 1st Division, under the command of Colonel Simon Yap.'

The UN Panel of Experts on South Sudan named it in January 2016 as one of the GOSS's most effective fighting forces (S/2016/70).

The Small Arms Survey wrote in early 2016 that '..[the] Division, stationed in Renk and widely regarded as the best fighting force in the country, is largely Nuer. Until 2 December 2015, it was under the command of Stephen Buay, a Bul Nuer who was subsequently redeployed to lead the SPLA’s 4th Division in Rubkona, Unity State. He was reassigned after months of rumours that he was planning to desert and join the SPLA–IO, following tensions with the Padang Dinka administration in Upper Nile.'
