= Martha Chol Luak =

South Sudanese politician

Acting Speaker of the Jonglei State Legislative Assembly

Personal details
- Citizenship: South Sudanese
- Party: National Congress Party (NCP)
- Occupation: Politician

Martha Chol Luak Kok is a South Sudanese politician. She hails from Akobo County. As of 2009 she was the acting speaker of the Jonglei State Legislative Assembly. She was elected to the Jonglei State Legislative Assembly in 2010 as a National Congress Party women's list candidate.
