= Ayod County =

Ayod County Gawaar Land
- County
- Nickname: Gaat-Pulwaar
- Motto: Gawar - Marekarroa (we're all related).
- Location in South Sudan
- Coordinates: 8.130949°N 31.41047°E
- Country: South Sudan
- State: Jonglei State
- Headquarters: Ayod

Government
  - County Commissioner: Gen.James Chuol Jiek

Area
  - Total: 5,193 sq mi (13,449 km^{2})

Population (2017 estimate)
  - Total: 192,937
  - Density: 37.156/sq mi (14.346/km^{2})
- Time zone: UTC+2 (CAT)

Ayod County {Formerly known as Yod locally } is an administrative area in Jonglei State, South Sudan, with headquarters in Ayod. Its inhabited by Gawaar Nuer categorically divided into two sections e.g Baar and Nyang then which are further consists of major clans of Chieng- Kapel, Bhaang, Jamuogh, Chieng -Thony, Chieng - Nyadakuon, Jithiep, Chieng-Pear, and Chieng-Nyaiguak. In the January 2011 referendum the results were unanimously in favor of independence from Sudan.

== Health issues ==
A study of Ayod village in December 1994 examined 759 people and found that 156, or 20.6%, had Guinea worm lesions. Dracunculiasis, the parasitical infection by the Guinea worm is caused by drinking contaminated water, and can be eliminated by providing a clean water supply. Levels of the bacterial eye disease trachoma are extremely high among residents of the county. In February 2011 it was reported that the county had been hit by a severe water shortage. This was caused by a combination of lack of rain, increasing numbers of returnees and failure by the authorities to repair over 10 boreholes.

== Security problems ==
In 2004 there were clashes between the Padang and Ciendool of Cienthoony from the Gawaar Nuer section in Ayod County. 35 people died in three separate fights. The cause of dispute was complex but seems to have involved the right to move cattle across community lands. In February 2011 there were clashes in Ayod County between Sudan People's Liberation Army troops and armed supporters of General George Athor Deng Dut. George Athor had lost the April 2010 gubernatorial election for Jonglei state, and had accused SPLM officials of rigging the results in favour of Kuol Manyang Juuk, who was elected. At least 20 people died in the clashes.

In May 2011 unidentified men raided Kuanydeng village in the Ayod South area, stealing a large herd of cattle. Six people died during the raid including three attackers. The Jonglei minister of law enforcement, Gabriel Duop Lam, said that absence of mid-lower teeth and small body scars on the bodies of the attackers indicated they were Murle people. The attack followed a much larger raid the month before by Nuer Lou on Murle in Pibor County in which over 400 people died. Kuanydeng is in the south of the county, near the border with Duk County. The stolen cattle were reportedly being driven between Duk and Pajut and moving in the direction of Pibor. Police were handicapped in stopping the movement due to lack of trucks or helicopters with which to give chase.
