= Ayod =

- Town
- Location in South Sudan
- Coordinates: 8.130949°N 31.41047°E
- Country: South Sudan
- State: Jonglei
- County: Ayod County
- Time zone: UTC+2 (CAT)
- Climate: BSh

Ayod is a town in Jonglei, South Sudan, headquarters of Ayod County. The Nuer people are the main inhabitants. Riek Machar, first vice-president of South Sudan, is the 26th son of the chief of both Ayod and Leer.

A study of the village in December 1994 examined 759 people and found that 156, or 20.6%, had Guinea worm lesions. Dracunculiasis, the parasitical infection by the Guinea worm, is caused by drinking contaminated water, and can be eliminated by providing a clean water supply.
