= Gabriel Duop Lam =

South Sudanese politician

Gabriel Duop Lam is a South Sudanese politician. As of 2011, he was the Minister of Law Enforcement in the state of Jonglei. A SPLA major, Lam has also served as commissioner of Ayod County.

Prior to the Revitalise Agreement on the resolutions of conflict in South Sudan 2018, Duop Lam was appointed as the head of JDB:- Joint Defence board to oversee the implementation of security arrangements.

Duop is the acting Chief of staff of SPLM IO. In March 2025, he was arrested on unspecified charges.
