= Pigi County =

- County
- Country: South Sudan
- State: Jonglei

Pigi County is a county in Jonglei State, South Sudan

ATAR/PIGI COUNTY, JONGLEI STATE DEMOGRAPHY

2008 Census population: 99,068

2020 Population projection*: 99,781

Ethnic groups and languages: Padang Dinka, sub-groups include 1. Paweny(Aniek, Buga, Jueny, Thiony and Tungdiak) occupying Atar Land 2. Luac, Rut and Thoi occupying Khorfulus

Displacement Figures: 6,836 IDPs and 5,763 returnees (2019)

== ECONOMY & LIVELIHOODS ==
ATAR/Pigi County is located on the northern edge of Jonglei State. It is bordered by Nyirol and Ayod Counties to the south, Fangak County to the west, and Panyikang County (Upper Nile) to the north. It is at the confluence of the Sobat and Nile Rivers just south of Malakal town. Additionally, the Atar River meanders through the county’s western region and the with the Fulus River tracking the eastern border. Areas immediately around the rivers are characterized by swampy vegetation of papyrus, reeds, Napier grass and bush scrub. Areas further out from the rivers transition into low, flood plains and bush. Some parts of the county are only accessible by foot, at times even traveling through swamps by boat during the rainy season.

Atar/Pigi County is part of the eastern plains, sorghum and cattle livelihood zone (FEWSNET, 2018). The primary livelihoods in this county include agriculture, rearing livestock, fishing, and foraging. A 2018 report from FAO and WFP estimated that 15% of households engage in agriculture. The main crops are sorghum and maize, as well as onion, okra, pumpkin, cowpeas, sesame, groundnuts, beans and vegetables. Better-off households keep cattle, goats and sheep. Lou Nuer cattle owners from neighboring Nyirol County typically travel northwest towards Atar/Pigi so their herds can access a reliable water source during the dry season. Under normal conditions floods are a significant livelihood hazard as they can limit fishing activities and reduce crop, livestock, and wild foods production. Additionally, even prior to the conflict, Atar/Pigi County was characterized by lack of development, poor physical infrastructure and periodic low-level conflict from cattle raiding and militia activity.

All of these factors contributed to underlying vulnerability to resource and livelihood shocks (IRNA 2014).This has led to gradual increases in food insecurity, with Atar/Pigi County having been determined to be at Crisis (IPC Phase 3) level of food insecurity in 2016, but projected to rise to Emergency (IPC Phase 4) levels of food insecurity throughout 2020. In 2019, Atar/Pigi was one of the counties reported to be most at-risk of famine in South Sudan.

Communities that rely on waterways to purchase goods and supplies, particularly during the rainy season, often experience an inflation in prices. Prior to the outbreak of the conflict in 2013, residents of Atar/Pigi could rely on selling assets in the market to accommodate for depleted food stores, however due to the deterioration of local supply-chains as well as insecurity along main trade routes, market functions have declined substantially over the last seven years. A March 2018 assessment conducted by REACH in Alela Payam reported that local traders did not have the capacity to purchase supplies from larger feeder markets, and as a result this has impacted the availability of goods locally. A February 2019 assessment by REACH reported that 50% of assessed areas were going entire days without eating as a means to cope with food insecurity. These weak supply chains have resulted in a severe shortage of agricultural equipment and supplies in some payams and contribute to a negative feedback loop, preventing residents from cultivating even during ideal conditions. Additionally, disease among cattle in Alela payam prevented residents from selling cattle in exchange for food, according to a 2018 REACH assessment. In Kurwai, a 2019 REACH assessment indicated that floods and bird infestations were preventing residents from engaging with agricultural activities.

== INFRASTRUCTURE AND SERVICES ==
The name and HQ of Atar/Pigi County has been historically contested and is reflected in the discussion of conflict dynamics below. The name ‘Canal’ comes from the Jonglei Canal that runs through the county. Construction of the canal began in 1980, but was the source of significant grievances, ran massively over-budget and posed severe disruptions to local livelihoods. While the project was designed to facilitate irrigation and enhance trade opportunities for Sudan and Egypt, it would mean diminished water supplies for South Sudanese communities on the downstream path. Additionally, the construction of the canal disrupted cattle movements and agricultural patterns – the extent of this impact is unknown to date. The construction of the canal ultimately became one of the proximate triggers for the outbreak of the second civil war with Sudan in 1983, and the area was bombed and the construction equipment was destroyed.

According to OCHA’s (2019) Humanitarian Needs Overview for 2020, over 85,000 people in the county have significant humanitarian needs, which accounts for 44% of the projected population of the county reported in the HNO. Additionally, the report indicates that more than half of the population have significant protection needs. ATAR/Pigi County also has one of the highest levels of explosive remnants of war (ERW), which has impeded access to services for the civilian population. A REACH assessment from February 2019 reported that 85% of assessed areas in ATAR/Pigi County reported that they have “no physical access to health services.”

Geographical barriers, poor road networks, intermittent fighting and prevalence of ERW have made it difficult for humanitarian organisations to deliver critical services and rehabilitate infrastructure since 2013. There has been minimal investment in telecommunication infrastructure, making it difficult to verify conflict events and the humanitarian needs of the local population. ATAR/Pigi remains one of the most isolated and hard-to-service counties in South Sudan.

== CONFLICT DYNAMICS ==
As noted above, grievances associated with the Government of Sudan’s construction of the Jonglei Canal was a key trigger for the start of the Second Sudanese Civil War in 1983. The population in Canal County is primarily Padang Dinka, although tensions have existed between Dinka sub-clans from Atar and Khorfulus town. The area has also been historically contested by both Shilluk and Nuer communities. The Shilluk communities to the north-west have laid claim to areas around the towns of Canal and Khorfulus in the north of the county. Lou Nuer live to the east and south, and Gawaar Nuer to the west and south. Widespread and long-term displacement of these communities during the Second Sudanese Civil war presents an obstacle to assessing these historical claims to land and control. These tensions have been reflected in disputes over the name of the county (changing from Khorfulus to Canal/Pigi in 2009), its assignment to mostly Dinka-controlled Central Upper Nile State between 2015-2020, and the location of the county headquarters (Craze 2019).

Widespread violence between the Dinka and Nuer communities in northern Jonglei was largely avoided early-on after the outbreak of fighting in December 2013, due to a prior local agreement between the groups to stave off fighting. The Padang Dinka of Canal/Pigi County are a distinct ethnic group from the Greater Bor Dinka living in southern Jonglei. The Padang Dinka have their own set of grievances with the South Sudanese government, including the experience of SPLA operations in the area in 2011. The Nuer White Army in northern Jonglei differentiates between the Padang and Greater Bor Dinka communities. In the hope that the Pigi community would join the opposition movement, the White Army declared that Padang Dinkas would not be attacked. While some Padang Dinka in Canal/Pigi County did take up arms with the opposition, or provided food to its fighters or Nuer refugees, many residents also fled north to Dinka-dominant areas and some joined the SPLA.

== Dynamic of Leadership ==
During the liberation struggle and around 2002 to 2003, Dr. John Garang de Mabior created more counties within the Southern Sudan region and Atar County was as a result of that initiative.

Hon. Santino Malual Met was appointed in 2003 as commissioner of Atar county, HQ Shulkel

After the CPA CDR, George Athor changed the name of the county, from Atar County to khorfulus county in 2006.

After they changed the county name to Khorfulus, Hon. Yor Chol Magon was appointed as the first and the last commissioner of khorfulus county from 2006-2009.

In 2009, the two communities of Paweny and Khorfulus signed the Malakal Peace Agreement, and they come up with one name which is Pigi County, and appointed Hon. Santino Riak Athian as the first commissioner of Pigi County from 2009-2011.

Hon.James Aleu Mijak was the second commissioner of Pigi County.

Hon. Abel Miakol Deng was the third commissioner of Pigi County.

Hon. Abraham Dau Gueng was the forth commissioner of Pigi County.

Hon. Mijak Monykuer Awok as the fifth commissioner of Pigi County

Hon. Nyok Mialual Mayiik as sixth the Commissioner

Hon. Siluman Deng Thonnyang as the seventh Commissioner of Pigi County

In 2016, a presidential decree resulted into the creation of 28 states and Pigi County was split into two counties of Atar County occupied by Paweny and Khorfulus County occupied by Luac, Rut and Thoi.

== ADMINISTRATION & LOGISTICS ==
Payams: Alam, Atar, Wunlith, Korwach, Alela and Wunlem

Roads:

A major road runs north-south through Pigi County, connecting Ayod, Bor, and Juba to the south to Malakal to the north. Seasonal road conditions are unknown. A river route that runs through the county, between Bentiu and Malakal, was open during both the rainy and dry season in 2019 according to the Logistics Cluster. UNHAS-recognized Heli-Landing Sites and Airstrips: Korwac

.
