= South Sudan Democratic Movement =

South Sudanese militant group

South Sudan Democratic Movement/Army
- Leaders: George Athor; John Uliny; David Yau Yau; Gordon Koang
- Group: Nuer
- Active regions: Jonglei & Upper Nile
- Ideology: Anti-SPLA
- Political position: Big tent
- Wars: the Ethnic violence in South Sudan

The South Sudan Democratic Movement (SSDM), sometimes called the South Sudan Democratic Movement/Army (SSDM/A), was a South Sudanese militant group. Along with its armed wing, the South Sudan Defence Army (SSDA), rebelled against the government of South Sudan led by President Salva Kiir and the Sudan People's Liberation Movement.

== Formation & First Rebellion ==
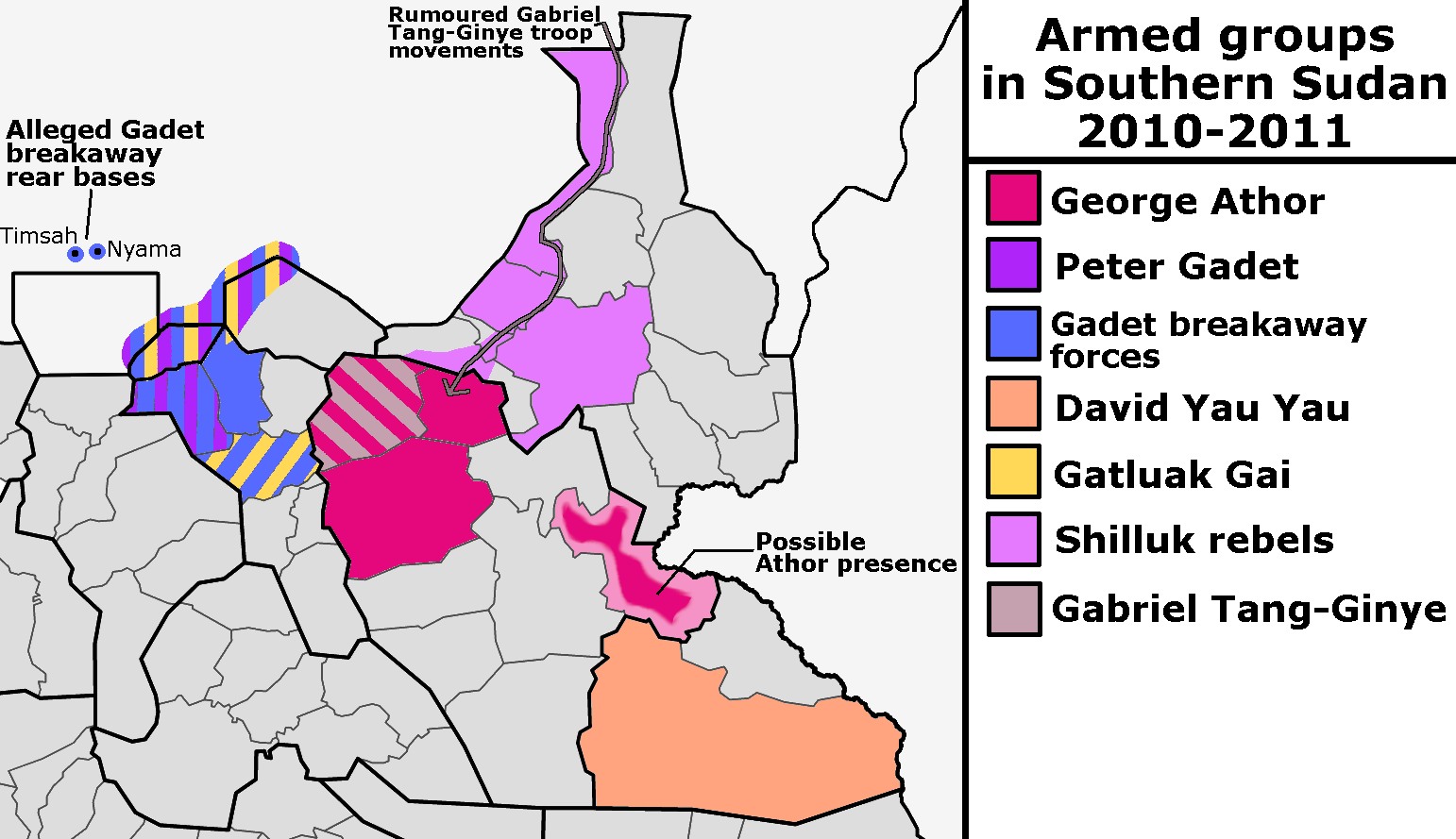
Map showing insurgencies in northeastern South Sudan from 2010 to 2011, several of which were led by rebels associated with the SSDM/A.

The Movement was formed in 2010 by controversial former Sudan People's Liberation Army general George Athor after he failed to win the governorship of Jonglei in what was then the Autonomous Government of Southern Sudan in the state of Jonglei as well as neighbouring Upper Nile in the Republic of South Sudan.

Due to Athor's access to military support from the Sudanese & Eritrean Governments, he was able to attract other dissenting SPLA commanders such as Gatluak Gai in Unity State, David Yau Yau in Pibor county, and Shilluk commanders John Uliny and Alyuak Ogot in Upper Nile. Whilst the Sudan People's Liberation Army (SPLA) accused the North Sudanese government of supporting the SSDM, SPLA officials did not elaborate on what role they believe Khartoum's backing has played.

Athor later signed a ceasefire agreement with the Government of South Sudan in January 2011, although the talks broke down and fighting re-erupted in February 2011. Other factions of the SSDM/A would later sign ceasefire agreements with the GOSS, with Yau Yau's faction signing one in June 2011, and Gai's in July 2011. Gai was allegedly murdered by his deputy in July 2011, although it is widely believed the SPLA were responsible, whilst Yau Yau, who had been stationed in Juba awaiting re-integration, would later defect to Khartoum in June 2012 and resume his factions insurgency in Jongeli in July 2012.

Athor himself was killed on 19 December 2011 in Equatoria by South Sudanese troops whilst allegedly attempting to cross into South Sudan from the Democratic Rebuplic of the Congo (DRC), resulting in Peter Kuol Chol Awan becoming SSDM/A Commander-in-Chief. The South Sudanese Government announced that the SSDM/A had signed a peace deal in February 2012, and SSDM/A Commander-in-Chief Peter Kuol Chol Awan travelled to Juba and surrendered to the SPLA on 8 March 2012. This agreement was not accepted by all SSDM/A factions however, and John Uliny's faction in Upper Nile rejected the agreement, with John Uliny claiming leadership of the SSDM, and remaining active until mid 2013. Small remnants of Athor's original force in Pigi County also rejected the agreement, remaining active until August 2013. The bulk of Athor's forces - some 1,300 - had been disarmed, trained, and were awaiting formal re-integration in Oinykibol training centre in Eastern Equatoria in late September 2013.

== Structure ==
Many SSDM fighters are from the Murle, a minority tribe that has long disputed herds of livestock and pasturing grounds with a fellow cattle ranching tribe, the Lou Nuer. Under Athor's leadership, Murle tribesmen repeatedly clashed with the Lou Nuer and the armed forces of South Sudan throughout much of 2011.

=== SSDM/A - Cobra Faction ===
The flag of the SSDA - Cobra Faction; a splinter of the wider SSDA, led by David Yau Yau.

David Yau Yau had been one of the members of the original SSDM/A rebellion, joining following his failure to win a seat in the Jongeli state legislature in the 2010 elections. His main motivation was claimed to be the underdevelopment of Pibor County in Jonglei and the lack of local power-sharing with the Bor government. In the first SSDM/A rebellion Yau Yau's force was relatively small, with ~200 receiving presidential pardons following peace negotiations in June 2011.

Yau Yau later returned to Pibor in July 2012 to restart his rebellion, having been dissatisfied with the integration package offered, and being opposed to the ongoing political marginalization of Murle people in Pibor county.

The Cobra Faction later signed a peace agreement on 30 January 2014 which established the semi-autonomous Greater Pibor Administrative Area.

In February 2015 a splinter from the Cobra Faction; the Greater Pibor Forces, joined with the forces of Riek Machar in the ongoing South Sudanese Civil War. In September 2016, however, the Cobra Faction was declared restored by some of its commanders and declared that it had resumed its struggle against the government.

=== SSDM/A-Upper Nile faction ===
The SSDM/A-Upper Nile faction was led by Shilluk commanders John Uliny and Alyuak Ogot, and was initially driven largely by disputes between the Shilluk community and the Upper Nile state government over land and county boundaries. Later motivations included revenge over the 2010 disarmament campaign, in which it was claimed the SPLA's 7th Division committed large scale abuses. The South Sudanese Government has claimed the Upper Nile Faction is linked with SPLM-DC, although SPLM-DC leader Lam Akol denies this.
