= Riek Gai Kok =

Governor of Jonglei State since 2025

Riek Gai Kok is a South Sudanese politician. He is a Lou Nuer, hailing from Chieng Man-nyang/Diang-nyang Akoba. A veteran politician, he has been a member of parliament in both Sudan and South Sudan. As of 2013, he served as Minister of Health of South Sudan. He was appointed as the governor of Jonglei State in March 2025.

== 1990s ==
As of the early 1990s, Riek Gai Kok served as head of the Relief Association of Southern Sudan, the humanitarian aid wing of the SPLA-Nasir. As of 1997-1998 he served as spokesperson of the South Sudan Independence Movement/Army (SSIM/A). As the late 1990s he served as wali (governor) of Jonglei state.

== 2000s ==
In 2002 he was named as chairman of the Southern States Coordination Council by president Omar al-Bashir. As SSCC chairman, Riek Gai Kok was charged with administering the states of Southern Sudan. The appointment followed the defection of Riek Machar to the rebel side. As of 2002, Riek Gai Kok was also serving as Minister of Animal Resources in the Sudanese government. At the time Riek Gai Kok was a leader of the South Sudan Defence Forces. Towards the end of the Second Sudanese Civil War he and a group of his followers broke with the SSDF leader Gordon Kong.

Riek Gai Kok was also a high-ranking member of the National Congress Party. He was the chairman of the Southern Sector of the NCP. He also served as advisor to the Sudanese president. On July 7, 2011, two days before the independence of South Sudan, Riek Gai Kok and other Southern NCP leaders held a press conference and declared their entry into the Sudan People's Liberation Movement.

== Post-Independence ==
In August 2013 Riek Gai Kok was named Minister of Health in the government of South Sudan. On March 10, 2025 he was appointed as the new governor of Jonglei state, replacing Mahjoub Biel Turuk.
