= Gier Choung Aloung =

South Sudanese politician

Gier Chuang Aloung is a South Sudanese politician. He served as Minister of Internal Affairs in the Cabinet of South Sudan. He was appointed to that position on 10 July 2011. In 2013, Gier was accused and arrested for a coup attempt that killed hundreds, though he denied all involvement and was later released and exonerated. Gier is now a businessman with ventures all over east Africa that he runs with the help of his children and wife. He is also a very well respected golf enthusiast and is the current president of the South Sudan Golf Union.

== See also ==
- SPLM
- SPLA
- Cabinet of South Sudan
