= Ethnic violence in South Sudan =

Part of the Sudanese nomadic conflicts

2020 ethnic map of South Sudan

Ethnic violence in South Sudan has a long history among South Sudan's various ethnic groups. South Sudan has 64 tribes with the largest being the Dinka, who constitute about 35% of the population and predominate in government. The second largest are the Nuers. Conflict is often aggravated among nomadic groups over the issue of cattle and grazing land and is part of the wider Sudanese nomadic conflicts.

In 2010, Dennis Blair, the United States Director of National Intelligence, issued a warning that "over the next five years... a new mass killing or genocide is most likely to occur in southern Sudan." In April 2017, Priti Patel, the Secretary of the United Kingdom's Department for International Development, declared the violence in South Sudan as genocide.

== Background ==
=== Nomadic raiding ===
Members of the Murle and Lou Nuer ethnic groups are largely nomadic cattle herders. Cattle are used as food and are used as a store of wealth. It takes 20 cows to buy a bride if a young man hopes to marry, which encourages cattle raiding. Violence between the two groups goes back generations, exacerbated by tensions over land and water. The attacks often target an entire village, burning them in their round thatched huts. Militias frequently abduct children during cattle raids, who are then forcefully adopted into the tribe. This is seen as a method, notably among the Murle, to increase the numbers of the small minority group. In past generations, attackers used machetes and sticks. However, after decades of civil war, the region is awash with guns, and young men are now armed with high-powered weapons. In 2017, local organizations said that more than 5,000 people had been killed since 2011 in cattle raids in South Sudan.

=== Sudan People's Liberation Army ===
The governing party, the Sudan People's Liberation Movement (SPLM), and the army, the Sudan People's Liberation Army (SPLA), have been accused of being dominated by the Dinka. Many refer to the dominance of the Dinka as the "Dinkocracy". A Dinka lobbying group known as the "Jieng Council of Elders" is often accused of being behind hardline SPLM policies. While the army used to attract men from across tribes, during the South Sudanese Civil War the SPLA came to be dominated by soldiers from the Dinka stronghold of Bahr el Ghazal, home region of President Salva Kiir and the Chief of Staff. The army was often referred to within the country as "the Dinka army". Many of the worst atrocities committed were blamed on a group known as "Mathiang Anyoor" (Brown Caterpillar) or "Dot Ke Beny" (Rescue the President), a Dinka militia formed to protect Kiir and Paul Malong Awan, though the SPLA claims that it is just another battalion.

=== South Sudan Democratic Movement ===
The South Sudan Democratic Movement (SSDM) is a rebel group founded in 2010 by George Athor after he lost a contested election. The group also incorporates and supports other factions as part of a broad coalition of those who complain of neglect by the Dinka dominated SPLA. This notably includes those composed of ethnic minorities such as the Murle people who lead the Cobra faction and the Shilluk people who lead the Upper Nile Faction. In a strategy of co-option known as "big tent", the government often buys off community militia and pardons its leaders. Others call the use of rebellion to receive public office as "bad culture" and an incentive to rebel.

== Murle-Nuer fighting ==
=== Uror massacre (2011) ===
On 18 August 2011, an attack in Uror County, northern Jonglei was reportedly launched by Murle tribesmen after armed groups infiltrated into the Peiri and Pulchuol Districts (Payams) at about 5 a.m. The attack is believed to have been a revenge operation against the Lou Nuer tribe after an attack on the Murle the previous June in Pibor County. At least 640 people were killed and the attackers burned down over 3,400 houses and the hospital run by Médecins Sans Frontières. An initial estimate showed that 38,000 heads of cattle were stolen and 208 children were kidnapped.

=== Pibor massacre (2011–2012) ===
Nuer White Army flag

By 25 December 2011, the Nuer White Army released a statement stating its intent to "wipe out the entire Murle tribe off the face of the earth as the only solution to guarantee long-term security of Nuer's cattle" and attack United Nations and SPLA personnel if they interfered. The United Nations Mission in South Sudan (UNMISS) deployed peacekeepers to Pibor on 30 December in an effort to avert an attack by 6,000 armed Lou Nuer youths. United Nations Secretary-General Ban Ki-moon and UNMISS head Hilde Johnson called on Lou Nuer and Murle fighters alike to lay down their arms and allow the government of South Sudan to work with them toward a lasting solution to the crisis. Activists, including Minority Rights Group International, warned of genocide in the conflict.

At 3 pm on 31 December, between 3–6,000 Lou Nuer tribesmen attacked a part of Pibor not protected by the UN peacekeepers. Houses were reported to have been set on fire and much of the town, including the airport and main hospital, were occupied. The Lou Nuer were said to have pursued members of the Murle who were fleeing southwards. The South Sudanese government promised to send more army personnel and 2,000 police to the town to reinforce the 800 troops already there. The healthcare charity Médecins Sans Frontières (MSF) said that it lost contact with 130 of its staff who were forced to flee into the bush due to the attack. MSF said that a hospital and two outreach clinics were overrun, with some reports stating that the hospital had been set on fire. Looting was said to have taken place at MSF facilities.

By 2 January, the majority of the Lou Nuer forces were said to have left Pibor and started to move to the southeast with a UN spokesman saying they were "almost certainly looking for cattle". The UN said that it had successfully held the main part of Pibor alongside South Sudanese army troops. The UN was advising people in the area to "disperse into the bush for their safety". Estimates for the number of displaced ranged up to 50,000, and more than 30 were killed with as many as 80 left injured. The SPLA dispatched 3,000 soldiers and 800 police to support the government's garrison in Pibor. On 5 January, Joshua Konyi, the commissioner of Pibor County and a Murle, estimated that 2,182 women and children and 959 men were killed, 1,293 children were abducted, and 375,186 cows were stolen. The United Nations estimated a total death toll of 900 between December 2011 and February 2012 as a result of the Nuer-Murle clashes, prior to the South Sudanese government's disarmament campaign in March.

A peace deal was signed in May 2012 by representatives of six ethnic communities in Jonglei state.

=== Akobo county attack (2013) ===
In February 2013, an attack by a group of armed Murle youth killed more than 100 civilians at Walgak and 14 SPLA soldiers.

=== South Sudanese Civil War ===
The Greater Pibor Forces split off from the Cobra Faction, which had signed a peace agreement with the government. They joined opposition forces and one of their disagreements with the government was the alleged encouragement of the Murle, as a method of divide and rule, to fight against Nuer groups in Jonglei, as some groups such as the Nuer White Army have fought against the government.

==== 2016 Gambela raid ====
On 15 April 2016, Murle fighters in South Sudan crossed over to the Jikawo and Lare areas of the Gambela Region (which hosts about 300,000 South Sudanese refugees) in Ethiopia and killed at least 208 people, stole 2,000 cattle and kidnapped at least 108 women and children from the Nuer tribe. Ethiopian troops killed about 60 gunmen and crossed over the border with the South Sudanese government's permission to track the kidnappers in what some felt is the spilling over of fighting into Ethiopia. By 2017, about 100 children had been retrieved.

==== 2017 Gambela raid ====
In March 2017, about 1,000 Murle gunmen from Boma State raided the Gambela Region in Ethiopia and abducted 43 children. They were pursued by the Ethiopian military.

==== 2020 Uror County massacre ====
In February 2020 in Jonglei, over 200 women and children were believed to have been abducted. At least 287 people were killed in Murle-Nuer clashes starting on 16 May 2020. As part of the deal to end the civil war, the number of states was reduced back to 10. However, there were disagreements over who should be the new governors and, even though the deal decreased political violence, the spike in inter-communal violence was attributed to the resulting power vacuum.

== Dinka-Nuer fighting ==
=== Second Sudanese Civil War ===
During the Second Sudanese Civil War, several factions split from the SPLA often along ethnic lines and were funded and armed by Khartoum. The most notable was SPLA-Nasir founded in 1991 by Riek Machar as an attempt by the Nuer to replace John Garang.

The South Sudan Liberation Movement (SSLA) was formed in 1999 as a Nuer-dominated faction in the civil war.

==== Bor massacre (1991) ====
As a result of the infighting, more southerners died at each other's hands than were killed by northerners during the war. In the Bor massacre in 1991, an estimated 2000 civilians were killed by SPLA-Nasir and the Nuer White Army and another estimated 25,000 died from the resulting famine in the following years.

=== South Sudanese Civil War ===
SSLM flag

In April 2011, The SSLA, now led by Peter Gadet, announces its formation as a rebel army fighting against the main SPLA forces. In 2011, SSLA clash with tribal cattle herders in Warrap State, south of Abyei. Southern authorities accuse the rebels of being backed by al-Bashir's Khartoum government, and say that the rebels are mobilizing the Misseriya against the SPLA in Unity State. To put down the rebellion, it was alleged that the SPLA set fire to over 7,000 homes in Unity state in May 2011.

==== Anti-Nuer pogroms (2013) ====
In 2013, after a year of escalating changes in government and in the party, including the dismissal of Vice-President Riek Machar and the entire cabinet in June, fighting between Nuer and Dinka SPLA soldiers broke out in Juba on December, igniting the South Sudanese Civil War. A rebellion rapidly spread around the country, with defected troops loyal to Machar and the SSLA taking over Bentiu, Malakal and Bor.

Immediately after the initial mutiny in Juba, Nuer soldiers, overpowered and on the run, made off toward Terekeka, north of Juba, leaving no Nuer soldiers left in the city. SPLM Dinka troops, led by Lieutenant General Marial Chanuong, were assisted by guides in house to house searches for Nuers in Nuer areas of the Juba. In the Gudele neighborhood, about 200–400 Nuer men were rounded up in to a room in a police station and were shot at through the windows over two days if the soldiers noticed signs of life. There were about 12 survivors. An African Union report cited Nuers being tortured, such as being forced to eat human flesh and blood and to jump into fires. Official death toll has not been released as Human Rights Watch has noted the South Sudan government troops had blocked access and were heavily guarding Gudele and other affected, now abandoned suburbs of Juba. The Guardian report also reported that 21 Nuer youths as well as three women were killed in two other incidents while Human Rights Watch cites eyewitness accounts of truck loads of bodies carried to undisclosed site on 18 December 2013. Government officials have not announced a list of the dead or the location of the bodies and have denied knowledge of any killings. Much of the killings were carried out by Mathiang Anyoor. Similar door to door searches of members of the Nuer ethnicity have been reported in the government held capital city of the Upper Nile State, Malakal.

Estimates for the death toll range as high as 15,000 to 20,000.

==== Bentiu massacre (2014) ====
During the South Sudanese Civil War, forces identified by the UN as SPLM-IO massacred about 200 mostly non-Nuer civilians in April 2014.

==== Mapel massacre (2014) ====
On 25 April 2014, ethnic tensions between Nuer trainees of the SPLA and Dinka civilians escalated in Mapel, at the time part of Western Bahr el Ghazal, resulting in altercations and murders. In response, Dinka soldiers of the SPLA's 5th Division, led by Bak Akoon Bak, massacred their Nuer comrades at the local training center, killing between 40 and 200 Nuer. The surviving Nuer soldiers fled into the bush, with some joining local SPLM-IO rebels or starting to escape northward. Joined by hundreds of other Nuer deserters from Wau and later Northern Bahr el Ghazal, the Nuer deserters marched all the way to Sudan to escape ethnic prosecution and loyalist SPLA forces.

== Murle-Dinka fighting ==
=== Sudanese Civil Wars ===
As early as 1963, during the First Sudanese Civil War, Khartoum began arming the Murle tribe, traditional enemies of both Dinka and Nuer, to fight the southern rebellion. Sometimes, whole tribal territories became affiliated with one side or the other, and the vicious north–south war became a defining factor in relations between tribes, infusing old hostilities with a new, political dimension. With the peace deal in 2005, tribal militias chose to either be absorbed into the SPLA or head north and join the armed forces there. Most chose to join their former SPLA enemies as a matter of survival. Others, like fighters from the Murle tribe, chose to join the northern army. Today, there are many Murle army officers in Khartoum, and they say the tribe is being punished for that.

The flag of the Murle dominated Cobra Faction; a splinter of the wider SSDA, led by David Yau Yau and then by Khalid Boutros.

=== Cobra faction rebellion ===
David Yau Yau, led a Murle dominated faction of the South Sudan Democratic Movement (SSDM) known as the Cobra faction against the government in 2010. He signed a ceasefire with the GoSS in June 2011, which integrated him and his militia with the SPLA. However, he defected again in April 2012 citing SPLA abuses in Pibor county in the March–October 2012 disarmament campaign that followed the Murle-Nuer clashes, called Operation Restore Hope. He now claimed to be fighting for a separate state for the Murle.

The Greater Pibor Administrative Area (highlighted) created as part of a peace agreement between the government and the largely Murle rebel group, the Cobra Faction, in 2014.

During the civil war in January 2014, the government signed a peace agreement called the Greater Pibor Administrative Area peace agreement with the Cobra Faction which created in May that year the semi-autonomous area called the Greater Pibor Administrative Area (GPAA) to increase the minority populations within its borders and David Yau Yau was appointed chief administrator, equivalent to state governor. Not all Cobra faction general were satisfied and a splinter group called the Greater Pibor Forces formed alleging that the SPLM were inciting the Murle to attack the Lou Nuer as a form of divide and rule. Further, on Christmas Eve 2015, Salvar Kiir announced an increase in the number of states from 10 to 28 and then, five days later, swore in all new governors appointed by him. The new borders give Kiir's Dinkas a majority in strategic locations. This replaced the GPAA with Boma State and replaced Yau Yau with Baba Medan Konya, angering the Cobra faction. In September 2016, the Cobra faction, now led by Khalid Boutros declared war against the government but in March 2017, Boutros dissolved the faction to incorporate it into the broader faction of the National Salvation Front led by Thomas Cirillo.

=== Jonglei-Boma conflict ===
Cattle raids between Dinka from the Dinka majority Jonglei state and the Murle from the Murle majority Boma State led to a peace agreement between both states on 5 December 2016 and to the formation of a joint police force recruited from the states of Jonglei, Boma and Bieh. However attacks across states continued. In March, armed youth and soldiers from Jonglei state attacked and captured Kotchar, in Boma state. Boma state officials, as well as Khalid Boutros of the Cobra faction, accuse the SPLA of supporting the attacks on Boma state. In November 2017, Murle gunmen attacked a Dinka village of Duk Payuel county in Jonglei, killing 45 people and abducting about 60 women and children.

=== 2020 Greater Jonglei war ===
Beginning in early 2020, Lou Nuer tribal militants launched attacks against the Murle in the Pibor region, killing many and causing thousands to flee into the bush or to seek shelter at a UNMISS base at Pibor. These attacks were possibly motivated by cases of cattle-rustling and desire for revenge for earlier clashes and massacres. In May, Murle militants responded by attacking and destroying Lou Nuer villages in the area, allegedly massacring up to 211 people. The violence was centered at the town of Pieri, where three aid workers were murdered amid the fighting. UNMISS promptly deployed more peacekeepers to the area to restore order. Another wave of violence erupted on 15 June, as Lou Nuer forces allied with Dinka Bor militants to target the Murle. In course of multiple raids and heavy fighting, several settlements were destroyed or damaged, thousands were forced to flee, and large numbers of cattle were stolen. Uniformed soldiers were spotted during the clashes, suggesting that army or ex-rebel forces had joined the irregular militias. President Kiir responded by forming a high-level committee tasked with bringing the situation in Jonglei under control.

=== 2022 clashes ===
In January 2022, Murle militias attacked Bor Dinka villages in Jonglei, killing dozens and destroying a number of villages.

== Shilluk-Dinka fighting ==
=== Shilluk disarmament campaign (2010) ===
Many from the Shilluk people contend that the Dinka as well as the Dinka and Nuer soldiers from the Sudan People's Liberation Army committed abuses in an attempt to disarm them in the summer of 2010. The SPLA burned scores of villages, raped hundreds of women and girls and killed an untold number of civilians in the Shilluk Kingdom. Over 10,000 people were displaced in the midst of the rainy season and sent fleeing into the forest, often naked, without bedding, shelter or food, with many children dying from hunger and cold. Civilians alleging torture by the SPLA claim fingernails being torn out, burning plastic bags dripped on children to make their parents hand over weapons and villagers burned alive in their huts if rebels were suspected of spending the night there. The United Nations Human Rights Council reported many of these violations, and the frustrated director of one Juba-based international aid agency called them "human rights abuses off the Richter scale".

=== Agwelek Forces, Tiger Faction New Forces and Democratic Change rebellions ===
John Uliny from the Shilluk people lead the Upper Nile faction of the South Sudan Democratic Movement in rebellion. In March 2011, in clashes between the Uliny's Upper Nile faction and the SPLA North of Malakal, the SSDM claimed that the SPLA killed 168 civilians and named six villages that the SPLA burned down. Human Rights Watch later confirmed that over 60 ethnic Shilluk were killed, and more than 7,000 displaced. The official United Nations report counted 62 dead, 70 injured and 7,625 displaced, but how many people were actually killed is unknown. During the civil war, in February 2016, 18 people were killed, including two Médecins Sans Frontières staff, in fighting between Shilluk and Dinka youths at a "protection of civilian" (POC) site, which are often divided by ethnic groups to prevent fighting.

Uliny entered into peace talks and accepted an amnesty by the government in 2013. However, during the civil war, after Kiir's floated the idea of carving new states which would give Kiir's Dinkas strong majorities and which the Shilluk felt would carve up their homeland, Uliny switched sides to fight with SPLO-IO in April 2015. His forces were now known as the "Agwelek" army. On 16 May 2015, the Agwelek forces and elements of the SPLM-IO captured Upper Nile's capital, Malakal, as well as Anakdiar and areas around Fashoda. The group said they want to run their affairs independently from others in Upper Nile State, and SPLM-IO backed away from claims that it is in charge of Olony's group and stated that Olony's interests simply coincides with theirs. SPLM-IO said they understood the feeling from the Shilluk community that they wanted a level of independence and that that was the reason the SPLM-IO last year created Fashoda state for the Shilluk kingdom and appointed Tijwog Aguet, a Shilluk, as governor.

As the predominantly Shilluk Agwelek forces joined, in July 2016, with the SPLM-IO, which entered the peace agreement with the government, some Shilluk felt dissatisfied. After the establishment of the new states, a new group made up of mostly Shilluk formed the "Tiger Faction New Forces" (TFNF), led by General Yoanes Okij, alleging that the new states gives power over Shilluk lands to the Dinka. They rejected joining the SPLM-IO or the peace agreement and called for the restoration of the original 1956 borders of the Shilluk territories. In September 2016, Shilluk politician Lam Akol, leader of the largest opposition party, Democratic Change, announced a new faction called the National Democratic Movement (NDM) to overthrow Kiir. Yohanis Okiech then joined the predominantly Shilluk NDM as deputy chief of general staff. In January 2017, Olony's forces working for SPLM-IO ambushed and killed Yohanis Okiech.

In the Upper Nile region, much of the fighting in 2016–17 was between the SPLA and the SPLA-IO allied Upper Nile faction of Uliny. During this fighting, Shilluk in Wau Shilluk were forced from their homes and Yasmin Sooka, chairwoman of the Commission on Human Rights in South Sudan, claimed that the government was engaging in "social engineering" after it transported 2,000 mostly Dinka people to the abandoned areas. The king of the Shilluk Kingdom, Kwongo Dak Padiet, claimed his people were at risk of physical and cultural extinction. He claimed the SPLA razed down several villages and that his lawyers were preparing a case before the International Criminal Court against senior SPLA staff and members of the Jieng Council of Elders.

== Fertit-Jur-Dinka fighting ==
=== Second Sudanese Civil War ===
During the Second Sudanese Civil War, many from the Fertit, which refers to the various Bantu related ethnic groups in Western Bahr el Ghazal such as the Banda and Binga, fought on behalf of the central government in Khartoum against the SPLA. Fertit militias often attacked Dinka civilians, with the police force in Wau, composed of Dinka, fighting for the Dinka.

Another group traditionally inhabiting the Bahr El Ghazal are the Jur people. In March 2011, a clash between Dinka pastoralists of Lakes State and Jur farmers from Western Equatoria over land issues left 7 people dead and 5 injured. This happened following a similar clash over pasture that killed 10 people the previous month. The two communities signed a memorandum of understanding in September 2011.

=== South Sudanese Civil War ===
In 2016, about a year after the Compromise Peace Agreement was signed, groups of ethnic Dinka youth and the SPLA targeted members of the Fertit in Wau, killing dozens and forcing more than 120,000 to flee their homes.

In April 2017, Mathiang Anyoor led by General Thayip Gatluak attacked Wau, targeting Jur and Fertit people, killing at least 18 people.

== Equatorian-Dinka fighting ==
=== South Sudanese Civil War ===
After the Compromise Peace Agreement, some observers felt that the government was holding on to the peace deal to maintain international aid while backing campaigns to increase Dinka control over land and resources traditionally held by other groups. In Western Equatoria, after Dinka cattle herders, allegedly backed by the SPLA, occupied farmland, Zande youth rose up into armed groups, notably the Arrow Boys. A new rebel faction calling itself the South Sudan Federal Democratic Party (different from but related to the larger similarly named rebel faction led by Peter Gadet, Gabriel Chang and Gathoth Gatkuoth), made up mostly of Lotuko people formed during this time due to growing perceptions of mistreatment by the "Dinka" government and took over a SPLA outpost in Eastern Equatoria.

For most of the South Sudanese Civil War, the fighting was focused in the Greater Upper Nile region. After the clashes in Juba in 2016, the fighting spread to the previously safe haven of Equatoria, where the bulk of SPLM-IO forces went for shelter. Accounts point to both sides targeting civilians on ethnic lines between the Dinka and the dozens of ethnic groups among the Equatorians who are historically in conflict with the Dinka, such as the Karo, who include the Bari. Witnesses report Dinka soldiers threatening villagers that they will kill all Kakwa, another Karo people, for their alleged support to Machar and killing Pojulu people while sparing those who they find can speak Dinka. Much of the atrocities in around Yei are blamed on Mathiang Anyoor. A UN investigation said rape was being used a tool of ethnic cleansing and Adama Dieng, the U.N.'s Special Adviser on the Prevention of Genocide, warned of genocide after visiting areas of fighting in Yei. On 4 April 2017, a pro-government militia reportedly led by Major Gen. Gildo Oling attacked mostly Acholis in Pajok and SPLA-IO claimed 200 civilians were killed.

Many of the self-defense factions formed among the Equatorians have targeted Dinka civilians, including in one case where a convoy of commercial vehicles along the Juba-Yei road was stopped and separated into Dinka and non-Dinka and the Dinka were executed, with up to 21 people killed. Among the refugees fleeing the violence are a few Dinka as well and they faced violence among Equatorians in the refugee camps as retribution. Ugandan authorities often house Dinka refugees separately to minimize violence.

== Dinka-Arab fighting ==
In January 2011, clashes between nomadic Misseriya Arabs and the Dinka people killed 'dozens' in Abyei preceding the independence referendum. A source of tension was reportedly the delay in holding a separate referendum for the Abyei region. The Dinka largely supported South Sudan's independence during the Second Sudanese Civil War. In February, at a market in Abyei, three people are killed and 300 sought refuge in a United Nations (UNMIS) mission compound. In the same month, in Todach, Abyei, ten people died when armed militias stormed a police post. Southern Sudan officials reported some of the attackers were Misseriya, but claimed the attack itself was connected to a Khartoum government-sponsored militia. In March, another militia attack in Abyei killed 30 people, as militias burned hundreds of dwellings and close to 25,000 people fled the town, migrating south. The United Nations then sent in 100 peacekeepers. The armed forces of north and south Sudan deployed heavy weapons to the region. In April, Sudan's president, Omar al-Bashir, issued a statement saying he will not accept South Sudan's independence as voted in the January referendum unless the north takes control over the oil-rich Abyei region. A draft proposal from the south claims Abyei. In May, Sudan's tanks entered Abyei in an attempt to clear out southern forces. The UN, US and UK condemned this move. By the end of the month, the African Union disclosed that a tentative agreement was reached, establishing a preliminary 20-kilometre ceasefire line and demilitarized region in Abyei. By June, the UN reported that 146,000 people had been displaced in the Abyei region, on the disputed border zone.

== Intra-Dinka fighting ==
In March 2011, an armed clash over a land dispute in Twic East County, Jonglei between members of the Ayuel and Dachuek Dinka, killed 22 people, including one SPLA officer.

In 2015, more than 70 people were killed in the Apuk and Aguok clans and 2,000 cattle were used as compensation for the victims. In June 2017, 38 people were killed in Gogrial State in fighting between Apuk and Aguok over border disputes.

In the Lakes Region, clashes between Ruop and Pakam clans in Malek County in 2018 killed at least 170 according to government officials, with 342 houses burnt and 1,800 people displaced. Clashes in 2019 between the Gak and Manuer, both of the Pakam, led to the deaths of 79 people.

=== Aweil-Warrap tension ===
During the South Sudanese Civil War, there was friction between the ruling Dinka elite. The President Salvar Kiir's Dinka of Warrap were in a feud with the Dinka of the chief of staff Paul Malong Awan's Aweil, who contributed the bulk of the government's fighting force. Around this time, the largely Dinka South Sudan Patriotic Army (SSPA) was formed in Northern Bahr el Ghazal, with the backing of powerful figures such as former presidential adviser Costello Garang Ring and allegedly Malong Awan. In May 2017, Kiir reduced the power of the chief of staff position and fired Malong Awan. Awan left Juba with most of his Mathiang Anyoor militia while other militia members reportedly joined SSPA. By the end of 2017, SSPA had claimed to have captured territory around Aweil. Awan was accused of plotting a rebellion and was detained but then released. In April 2018, Awan announced the launch of a rebel group named South Sudan United Front (SS-UF), which claimed to push for federalism.

== Intra-Nuer fighting ==
=== Second Sudanese Civil War ===
During the Second Sudanese Civil War, The Luo Nuer and the Jikany Nuer were in open conflict, particular around Nasir in Nasir County, from the SPLA split in 1994 to around the end of the war in 2004.

=== South Sudanese Civil War ===
During the South Sudanese Civil War, the Nuer dominated South Sudan Liberation Army, led by Mathew Pul Jang, sided with the government and helped take back Bentiu in December 2013.

The Dinka dominated SPLA recruited militias and young men from the Jikany Nuer and Bul Nuer in Unity state to take back areas held by the Nuer dominated SPLM-IO.

The main Nuer led opposition, the Sudan People's Liberation Movement-in-Opposition, had a split with those loyal to Taban Deng Gai, called the Juba faction of the SPLM/A-IO, joining with the government to fight the rebels.

== Bibliography ==
- The Conflict in Northern and Western Bahrel Ghazal States (PDF). Geneva: Small Arms Survey. 16 October 2014. Archived from the original (PDF) on 7 June 2021.
