= Nyirol County =

Nyirol
- County
- Country: South Sudan
- Region: Greater Upper Nile
- State: Jonglei State
- Headquarters: Pading

Area
  - Total: 7,735 km^{2} (2,987 sq mi)

Population (2017 estimate)
  - Total: 151,727
  - Density: 19.62/km^{2} (50.80/sq mi)
- Time zone: UTC+2 (CAT)

Nyirol County is an administrative area of Jonglei State in the Greater Upper Nile region of South Sudan.
