= Khorfulus County =

County in South Sudan

Khorfulus County was a county in the former Eastern Nile of South Sudan. Khorfulus County is the Land of Dinka Padang that comprises Luach, Rut, Thoi and Paweny Dinka. These group of people are pastoralist and practice small scale farming. They border Shilluk to the North, Dinka Ngok to the East and Nuer to the South and West.
