= George Athor =

Rebel leader of SPLA (1962–2011)

- George Athor in 2010
- Born: c..1962
- Died: 19 December 2011 (aged 48–49)
- Cause of death: Gunshot wounds
- Burial place: Juba, South Sudan
- Military career
- Allegiance: Sudan People's Liberation Movement (1983–2010); South Sudan Democratic Movement (2010–2011)
- Branch: Sudan People's Liberation Army (1983–2010); South Sudan Defence Army (2010–2011)
- Service years: 1983–2011
- Rank: Lieutenant general
- Conflicts: Second Sudanese Civil War; Disarmament of the Lou Nuer; George Athor's rebellion †

George Athor Deng (1962 – 19 December 2011) was the Sudan People's Liberation Army lieutenant general and a SPLA dissident who led the South Sudan Democratic Movement and its military wing, the South Sudan Defence Army. He was also an independent candidate for the leadership of Jonglei prior to the independence of South Sudan.

== Early life ==
George Athor was born Pigi country, Jonglei state in 1962. Athor belonged to the Padeng sub-clan of the Dinka people. Athor joined the SPLA in 1983 and was appointed to the rank of major general after the SPLA formalised their rank structures after 2005. Athor became Upper Nile (1st Division), then Jonglei division commander (Jonglei being 8th Division). He was later promoted to lieutenant general and made deputy chief of staff for political and moral orientation.

== Insurgency ==
George Athors rebellion started after he lost the election for the governorship of Jonglei in the April 2010 elections, suspicions of fraud in the process, Athor orchestrated a series of attacks on SPLA bases In Jonglei and Upper Nile. Further attacks lead to great insecurity in the north-western portion of Jonglei state. Numerous rumors accused him of being involved into weapons smuggling, traffic of influence and misappropriation of funds both in Jonglei and Upper Nile. He was also deeply involved in the White Army bloody disarmament in 2006. Athor reportedly agreed to a ceasefire before the January 2011 referendum but the peace talks broke down in February 2011. During February 200 civilians were reportedly killed by Athor's men.

== Death ==
On 20 December 2011, SPLA spokesman Philip Aguer stated that Athor had been killed in Morobo County, Central Equatoria trying to enter South Sudan from the Democratic Republic of the Congo in an attempt to gain more troops. The death of Athor was confirmed by South Sudan's Vice-President Riek Machar who said that he was killed on 19 December in a clash with the army.

== See also ==
- Peter Gadet
- Gabriel Tang
