= Kuol Manyang =

South Sudanese politician (born 1945)

Kuol Manyang Juuk

Minister of Defence of South Sudan
- In office 2013 – March 2020
- Preceded by: John Kong
- Succeeded by: Angelina Teny

Personal details
- Born: Kuol Manyang Juuk; 1945 (age 80–81) Mathiang
- Party: Sudan People's Liberation Movement

Kuol Manyang (born 1945) is a South Sudanese politician. He is a member of the SPLM. He became governor of Jonglei state on 15 December 2007, following the first former governor, Philip Thon Leek from Dinka Bor, to curb cattle raiding and abduction of children in the region.

== Biography ==
Kuol is also from Dinka Bor of South Sudan. He was born in 1945 in Mathiang village, located about 25 kilometers northeast of Bor town, capital of Jonglei state. He comes from Pathuyith clan, a well-known warrior section in Dinka Bor from Agok lineage. He pursued elementary and intermediate education in Malakal before going to Khartoum Vocational Training Centre, where he was awarded a diploma in engineering, earning him employment in Wed Madeni, Gezira state, in central Sudan, as a vocational inspector at the center. He later went to East Germany for studies at one of the technical institutes in Magdeburg for two years, 1978–77, where he earned another diploma in engineering. Juuk was appointed instructor at a vocational training centre in Wau in 1977 following his return from East Germany. He later moved to Juba in 1978 where he worked as deputy manager at the Multipurpose Training Centre (MTC) until December 1983 when he decided to rebel against the Sudanese government and joined the Sudan People's Liberation Movement (SPLM).

He is one of the tallest members in The SPLA commanders. Mr. Kuol is known in Southern Sudan as anti-corruption and development oriented official. He is one of the architect of fairness throughout the liberation struggle and areas of his direct control. Previous to becoming governor of Jonglei, he was Minister of Roads and Transport in the government of National Unity of Sudan. At a party congress at Bor, Kuol was reappointed chairman of the Sudan People's Liberation Movement in Jonglei state, and Deputy Governor Hussein Maar Nyuot deputy chair. A priority for Kuol has been achieving civil order through disarming the various armed groups in South Sudan; sources credit Kuol with being the primary force for that country's disarmament campaign carried out from June through November 2008.

Kuol Manyang continued to serve as Jonglei governor until he was appointed in 2013 as minister of defense. Besides holding this position, he remains the head of the SPLM branch office in Jonglei and continues to hold membership in the SPLM Political Bureau. He was sanctioned by the United States on December 16, 2019, for allegedly fomenting conflict in South Sudan.

== Military career ==
Commander Kuol Manyang was one of the high-ranking SPLA commanders. He served as the zonal commander in Bor from 1985 to 1988. Before he joined the SPLA He was a lecturer in Juba. He was educated in Europe. The line of succession was already determined by each individual's seniority in the SPLM/SPLA Political-Military High Command. Below is the list according to their seniority:

1. Cdr Dr. John Garang,
2. Cdr Kerubino Kuanyin Bol
3. Cdr William Nyuon Bany
4. Cdr Martin Majier Gai Ayuel
5. Cdr Salva Kiir
6. Cdr Arok Thon Arok
7. Cdr Nyacigak Nyaculuk
8. Cdr John Kualang
9. Cdr Dr Riek Machar Teny
10. Cdr Dr Lam Akol Ajawin
11. Cdr Yusif Kuwa Mekki
12. Cdr James Wani Igga
13. Cdr Daniel Awet Akot
14. Cdr Kuol Manyang Juuk
15. Cdr Lual Diing Wol
16. Cdr Gelario Modi
17. Cdr Philip Lomodong Lako

== Political career ==
- Minister of transport, Roads and Physical infrastructure
- Governor of Jonglei State
- Jonglei State SPLM/A Chairmanship
- High Executive Council
- Minister of defence and veterans affairs
