= Duk County =

- County
- Country: South Sudan
- State: Jonglei
- Time zone: UTC+2 (CAT)

Duk County (also known as Duk) is a county in Jonglei, South Sudan. In May 2016, it was divided into three counties which were Duk Padiet, Duk Payuel, and Panyang. In 2017, the governor of Jonglei State added Duk Pagaak County, totaling four counties in former Duk County. However, in 2020, President Salva Kiir reinstated the original number of states and counties, thus reunifying original Duk County. In Duk County is the village of Duk Payuel, the birthplace of John Dau who is one of the "Lost Boys of Sudan."

Youth from the Hol community in Duk County were attacked by people from Twic East County in a dispute over control of an island used for fishing.
