= Pibor County =

Pibor
- County
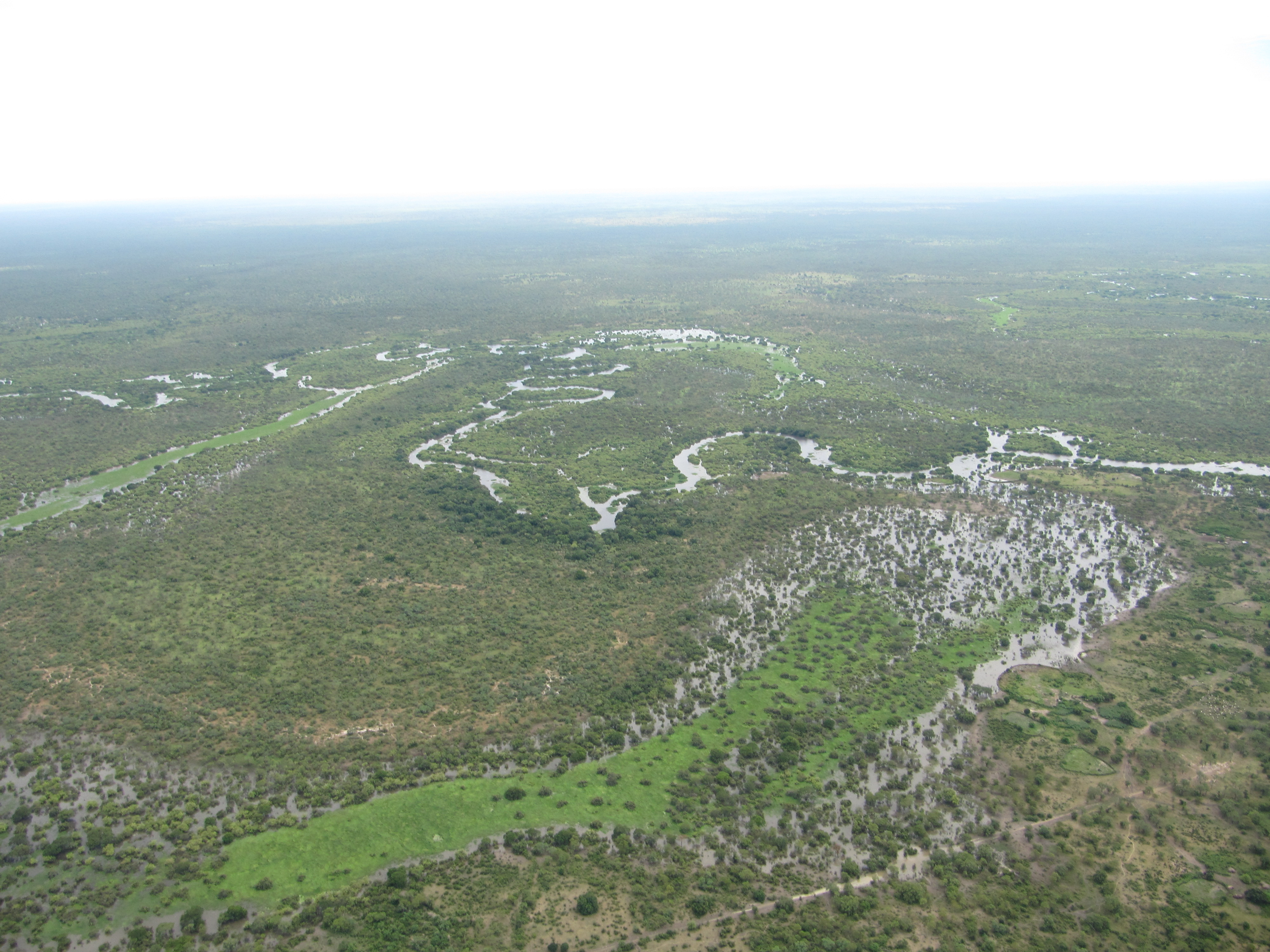
- Country: South Sudan
- State: Greater Pibor Administrative Area
- Headquarters: Pibor
- Time zone: UTC+2 (CAT)

Pibor is a county in the Greater Pibor Administrative Area, South Sudan. The county was part of the erstwhile Jonglei state.

During the 2011–2012 South Sudan tribal clashes some six to eight thousand "armed raiders" entered the county in late December 2011, ransacking and burning. Three Médecins Sans Frontières clinics, the only source of formal healthcare in Jonglei state, were looted and torched.

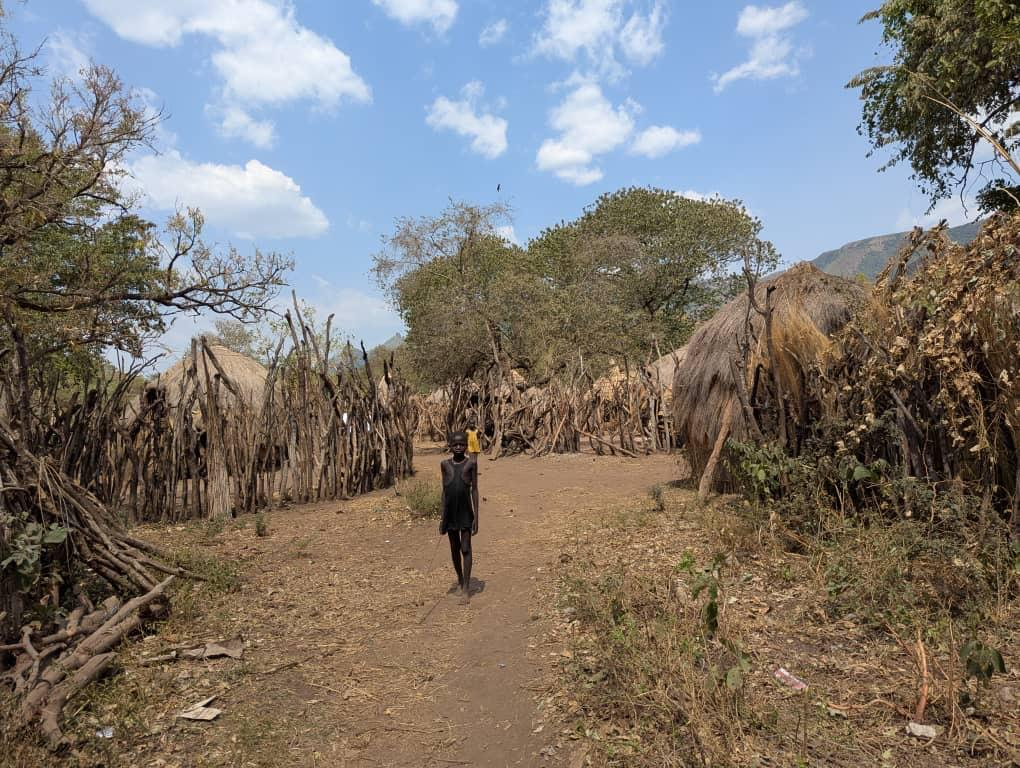
A village in Boma Payam, Pibor County

International food security experts said in December 2020 that Pibor County was likely in a famine. Flooding and violence have prevented access to aid. The Famine Review Committee report released by the Integrated Food Security Phase Classification said at least 20% of households were facing extreme food gaps and at least 30% of children were acutely malnourished.
