= Jonglei State =

State of South Sudan

- State
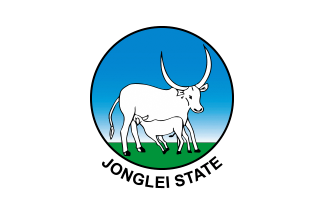
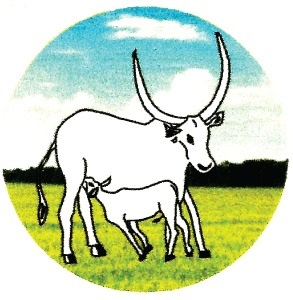
- Flag Seal

- Jonglei in South Sudan between 2015 and 2020

- Jonglei in South Sudan before 2015
- Coordinates: 07°24′N 32°04′E
- Country: South Sudan
- Region: Greater Upper Nile
- Number of counties: 11
- Capital: Bor

Government
  - Governor: Riek Gai Kok

Area
  - Total: 80,926 km^{2} (31,246 sq mi)

Population (2017 Estimate)
  - Total: 1,873,176
- Time zone: UTC+2 (CAT)
- HDI (2021): 0.335 low · 8th of 10
- Website: https://jongleistate.org

Jonglei State is a state of South Sudan with Bor as its centre of government and the biggest city. Jonglei state comprises nine counties: Bor, Akobo, Ayod, Uror, Duk, Nyirol, Pigi, Twic East, and Fangak. Jonglei State is the largest state by area before reorganisation, with an area of approximately 122,581 km^{2}, as well as the most populous according to the 2008 census conducted in present-day South Sudan's second period of autonomy. The boundaries of the state were again changed as a result of a peace agreement signed on 22 February 2020.

In the 21st century, Jonglei State has been marred by ethnic clashes, which the United Nations Mission in South Sudan (UNMISS) estimated in May 2012 had affected the lives of over 140,000 people, and which have been magnified by the broader South Sudanese conflict since December 2013.

== Administrative divisions ==
Jonglei State is divided into 9 counties as follows:

- Akobo County
- Ayod County
- Bor County
- Duk County
- Fangak County
- Nyirol County
- Pigi County
- Twic East County
- Uror County

== History ==
=== 20th century ===
The capital of the state, Bor, became an administrative centre under the Anglo-Egyptian Sudan (1899 -1956) for the Dinka Bor. It was in Malek, a small settlement about 19 kilometres (12 mi) south of Bor, that the first modern Christian mission in present-day South Sudan was established by Archibald Shaw in December 1905. Bor became the first area to host a Church Missionary Society station in 1905. Shaw opened the first primary school in Malek. This school produced the first indigenous Anglican bishop to be consecrated in Dinka land, Daniel Deng Atong, the first person to be baptized in 1916 in Bor. In 1912, the British established Pibor Post, a colonial era outpost which was originally called Fort Bruce in the eastern part of Jonglei State. From 1919 to 1976, the territory belonged to the state of the Upper Nile region in what was initially Anglo-Egyptian Sudan.

The state has a long history of unrest which affected other parts of Sudan. The First Sudanese Civil War which lasted from 1955 until 1972 broke out with a Southern rebellion in Torit in imatong state) against Northern armed officers. In 1983, the Second Sudanese Civil War also broke out in Bor.

In the 1970s, the Investigation Team was established by the Sudanese government to investigate affairs and development potential in the region. In 1976, Jonglei was split off from the Upper Nile as a separate province. Construction of the Jonglei Canal project, a 360 km long canal between Bor and where the Sobat River joins the White Nile began construction in 1978 but was halted in 1983-4 for political, financial and technical reasons. From 1991 to 1994, the territory was again included within the newly defined borders of Upper Nile State. On 14 February 1994, Jonglei state was again split off as a separate state.

=== 21st century ===
Jonglei State has long suffered from tribal infighting. Much of the conflict is over basic resources of food, land, and water, and personal grudges related to the abduction of women and children and theft of cattle. In November and December 2007, clashes between Murle and Dinke tribesmen had worsened to revenge attacks, killing over 34 people and injuring over 100. On one outbreak in late November 2007, eight Dinka tribesmen and 7,000 cattle were stole near the village of Padak, about 20 kilometres north-east of Bor. Many fled to the Kakuma Camp in northwestern Kenya, and they amounted to some 85 percent of the total 3,000 or so refugees reaching the camp.

Violence between Murle and Nuer tribes has been central to the attacks in the state. The Geneva Small Arms Survey concluded that the "Murle–Lou Nuer conflict in Jonglei State is indicative of how tribal and political dynamics are intertwined in the post-CPA period." A civilian disarmament operation targeting primarily the Nuer communities in 2005–06 resulted in a major outbreak of violence against the authorities, who believed that the crackdown was politically motivated. In August 2007, some 80 people were killed in Murle–Lou Nuer clashes. In 2009 alone, some 86,000 people were displaced, and at least 1248 killed as a result of violent clashes. One attack at Lilkwanglei in March 2009 claimed 450 lives, wounding 45 and displacing 5000 people. A month later, 250 were killed, 70 wounded and 15,000 displaced at Akoko. 24,000 were displaced as a result of attack in August 2009 at Panyangor. Between January 2011 and September 2012, some 2600 people died in clashes in Jonglei State. In January 2012 clashes between Murle and Nuer tribes again broke out over cattle. Outbreaks between Nuer and Murle people have been the most severe in Nyirol and Pibor counties but have also affected other counties.

In May 2012, state governor, Kuol Manyang Juuk stated that 3,651 people had been killed, 385 people wounded, 1,830 children abducted, and 3,983,613 cattle stolen. The UN estimated at the time that ongoing clashes had affected the lives of over 140,000 people. The Sudan People's Liberation Army (SPLA), international defence forces, and UN Peacekeepers are struggling to defuse the ongoing conflict and protect civilians against raids. The Bor Peace Conference was signed on 6 May 2012 in Bor, and has since been trying to improve the situation in the region. Despite the peace agreement, attacks continued to follow. On 9 May 2012 two people were killed and one was injured in an attack by the Murle on 32 cows in Twic East. A day later, a car traveling from Juba to Bor belonging to the South Sudan Ministry of Roads and Bridges was attacked near Panwell village in Bangachorot, killing the driver and wounding two policemen.

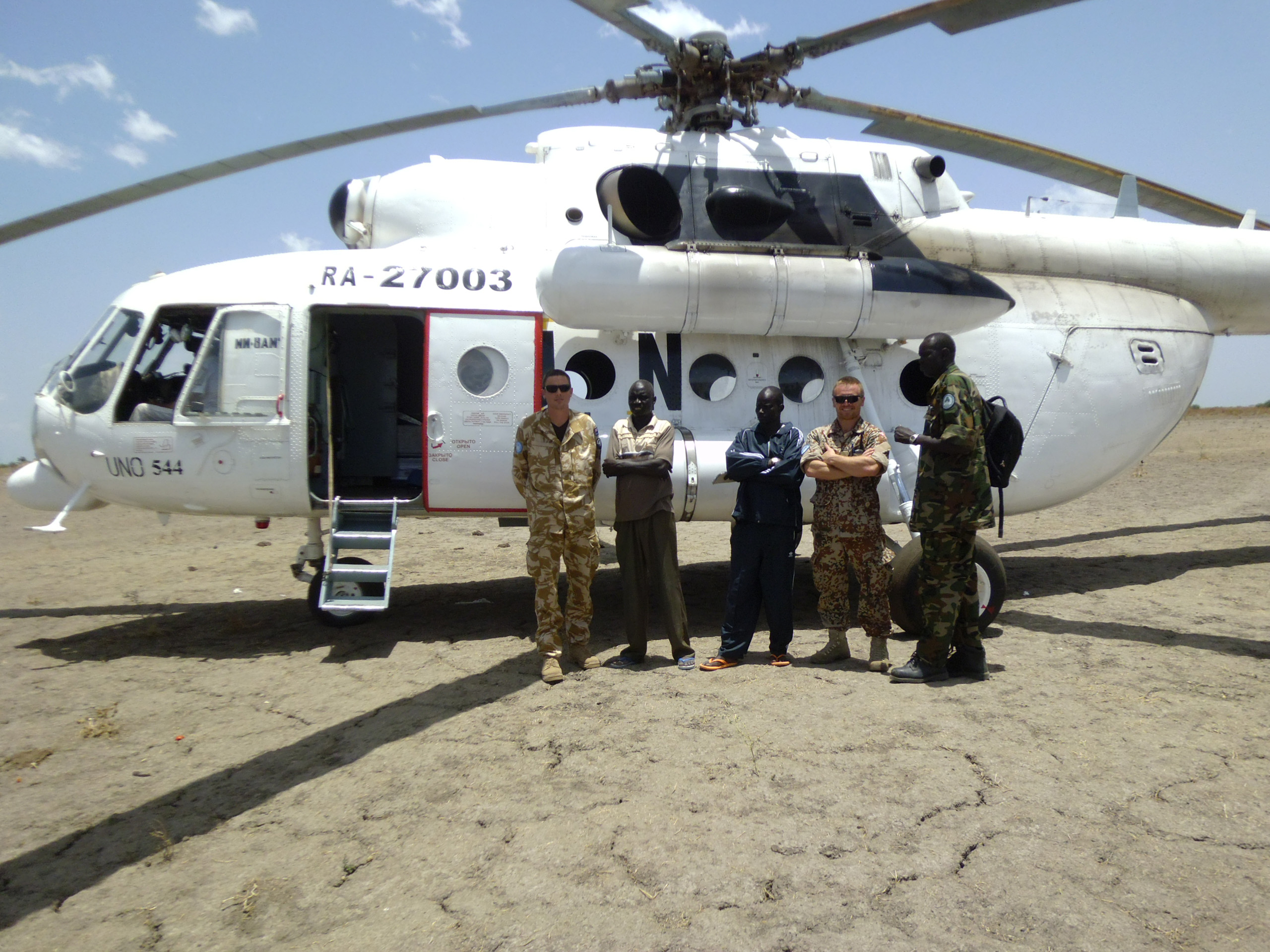
New Zealand Defence Force in Jonglei

In January 2013, more than 100 people, mainly women and children, were slaughtered during cattle raids. In February 2013, 114 civilians, mainly women and children, along with 14 SPLA soldiers, were killed in Walgak after the community was attacked by the rebel group of David Yau Yau and Murle youth. On 9 April 2013, five Indian UNMISS troops and seven civilian UN employees (two UN staff and five contractors) were killed in a rebel ambush in Jonglei while escorting a UN convoy between Pibor and Bor. Nine further UN employees, both military and civilian, were wounded and some remain missing. Four of the civilians killed were Kenyan contractors working to drill water boreholes. One of the dead soldiers was a lieutenant-colonel and one of the wounded was a captain. According to South Sudan's military spokesman, the convoy was attacked by Yau Yau's rebel forces that they believe are supported by the Sudanese government. UNMISS said that 200 armed men were involved in the attack and that their convoy was escorted by 32 Indian UN peacekeepers. The attackers were equipped with rocket propelled grenades. A UN spokesman said that the fierce resistance put up by their peacekeepers forced the rebels to withdraw and saved the lives of many of the civilians. UN Secretary-General Ban Ki-moon labelled the killings a war crime, and called for the perpetrators to be brought to justice. Rebel group South Sudan Democratic Movement/Army (SSDM/A) denied responsibility for the murders of the UN peacekeepers.

== Geography ==
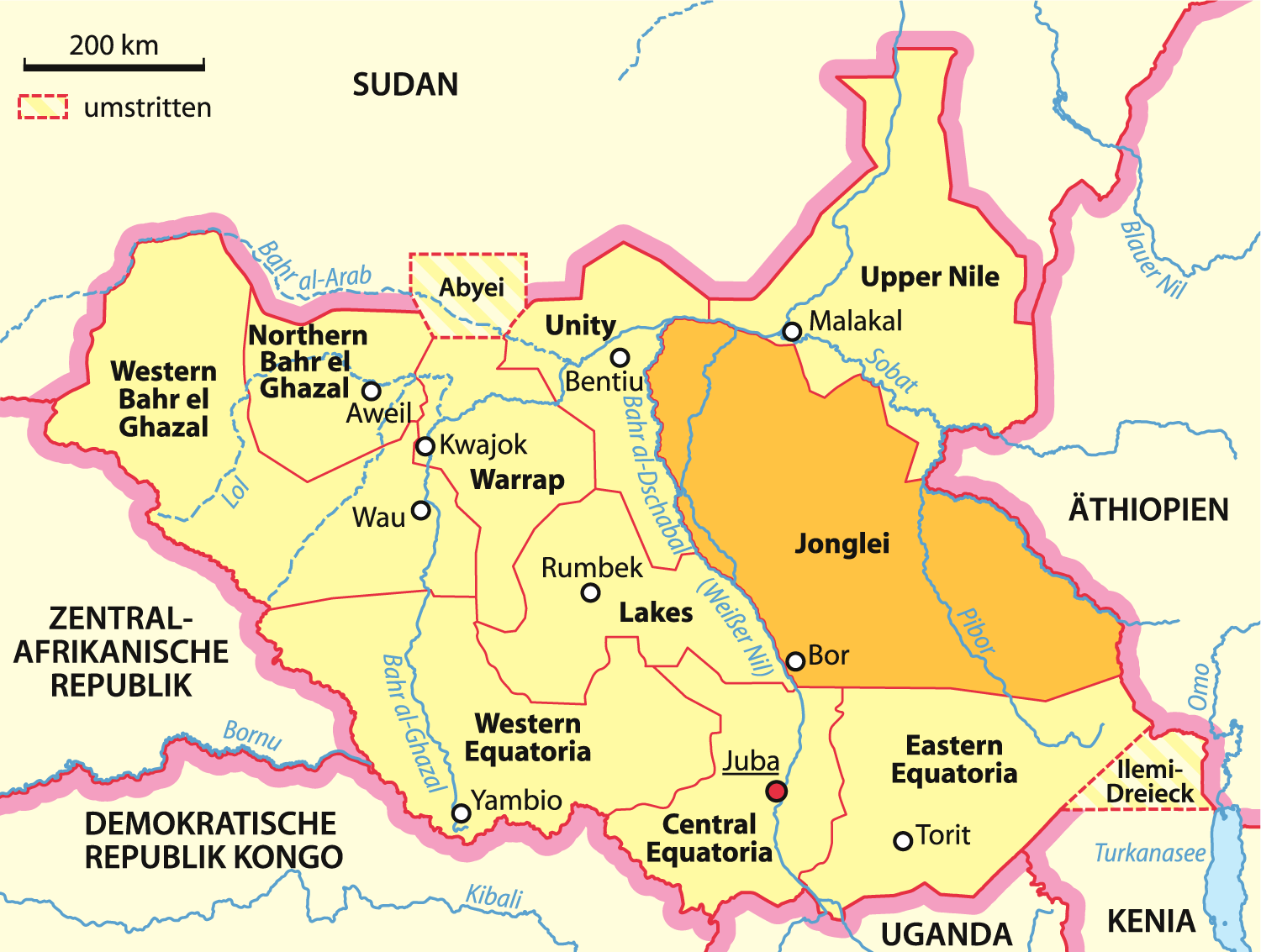
Map showing Jonglei before creation of new states in 2015

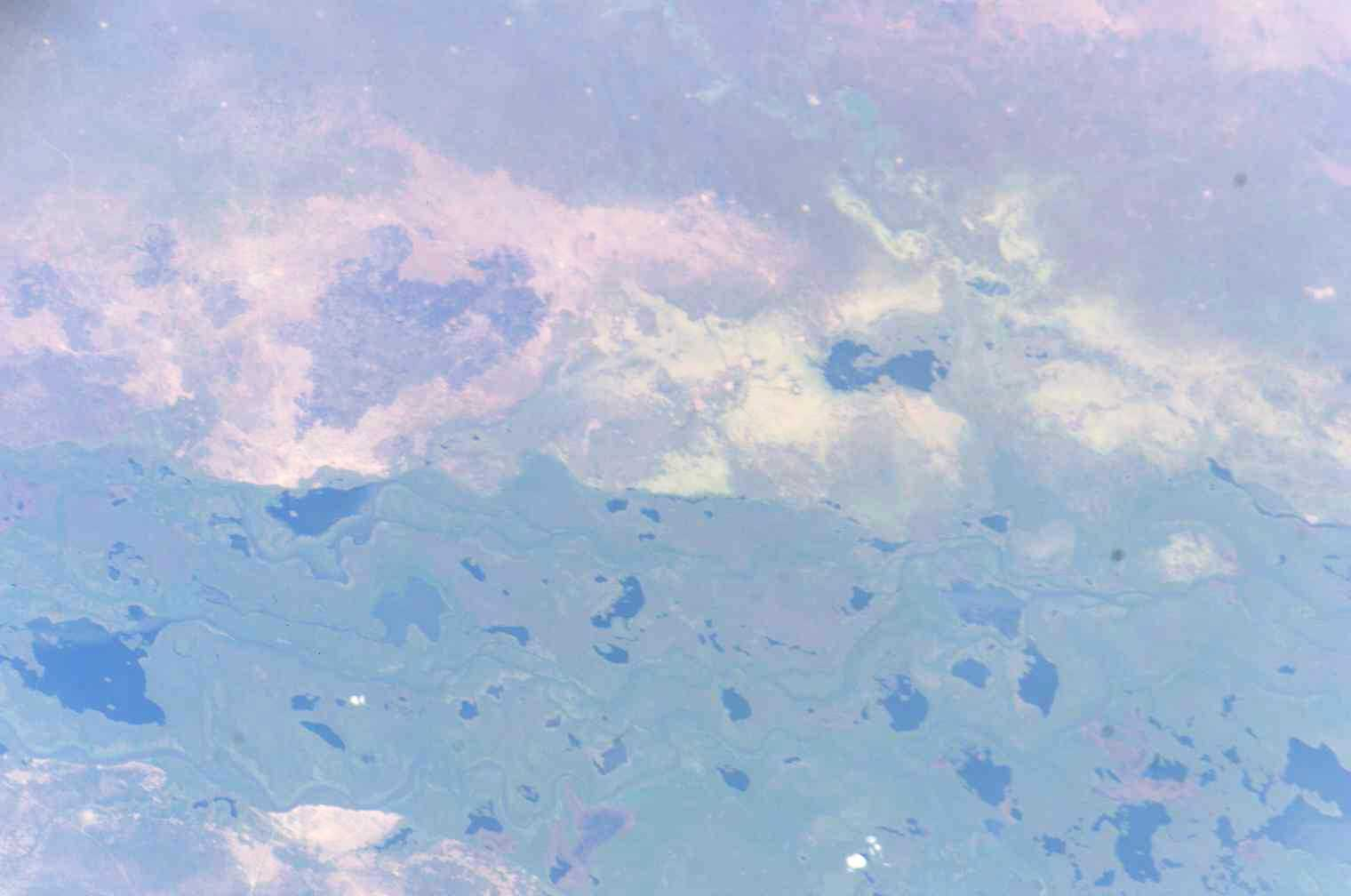
The White Nile near Bor

Jonglei State, which covers an area of 122,581 square kilometres (47,329 sq mi), forms the bulk of the eastern part of South Sudan covering most of the east-central region. Located in the Greater Upper Nile region, it is bordered by Upper Nile State to the north, Unity State to the northwest and west, Lakes State to the southwest, Central Equatoria to the southwest, Eastern Equatoria to the south, and Ethiopia to the east.

The principal town, Bor, lies in the southwestern corner of the state. Other towns include Akobo, Ayod, Fangak, Padak, Pibor, Pochalla and Waat. The principal rivers are the White Nile, which flows in the western part of the state, and the Pibor River, which flows in the central-east. The Pibor and its tributaries drain a watershed 10,000 km^{2} (3,900 sq mi) in size. The river's mean annual discharge at its mouth is 98 m³/s (3,460 ft³/s). In the southern part of the state is the Kenamuke Swamp (Kobowen), a wetland which is part of the Boma National Park. In June 2007, Animal Geographic Magazine estimated that over 1.3 million animals lived in Boma National Park. It is "home to one of the largest migrations in the world with an estimated 800,000 white-eared kob antelope, 250,000 Mongalla gazelle and some 160,000 tiang moving across Jonglei State", according to the Wildlife Conservation Society.

== Economy ==
The economy of Jonglei State is mostly dependent upon livestock, agriculture and fishing. Most of inhabitants are employed in the agricultural sector. UNEP says that the Dinka people of the state are "agro-pastoralists, combining cattle-rearing with wet season agriculture, and migrating seasonally according to the rains and the inundation of the toic (seasonal floodplains)." Most of Jonglei State falls within the oil development Block B, which was granted to Total S.A. before independence. Chevron Oil has been one of the major developers of oil extraction in Jonglei. Exploration of petroleum has been stalled by ongoing (as of January 2013) violence.

The Jonglei Canal Project, formulated in the mid 1970s to build a 360 km long canal between Bor and where the Sobat River joins the White Nile in the far north near Malakal, is the most prominent project to have ever been conducted in the state and is also one of its greatest failures. Construction began in 1978 but was halted in 1983-4 for political, financial and technical reasons, and today abandoned machinery used to construct the canal is rusting away. The project was a highly controversial one, and in 1979 the Wildlife Clubs of South Sudan (WCSS) was established, which led the campaign against its construction. The building of the canal had a negative impact on the lives of thousands of people in local communities who had to be displaced to accommodate for the canal, and "deprived them of dry-season grazing land for their cattle and other livestock". Although New Scientist said in 1983 that the impact of the canal which by-passed a large area of the Sudd swamps was unclear, more recently experts have concluded that it would have had a devastating impact upon the vast wetland in the south of the state which is a unique ecosystem for a diversity of wildlife, drying it up. Researchers from Iowa State University concluded that the canal project to provide irrigation had always been a lost cause and would have proved ineffective and that future agricultural development in southern Sudan could only be achieved by rain-fed crops and mechanized agriculture. Whittington and McClelland in 1992, however, evaluated the opportunity costs of the Jonglei Canal I project at $US 500 million.

The main hospital and schools are in Bor. Access to adequate healthcare in the state is extremely poor, and the situation has worsened since 2009 when Médecins Sans Frontières Belgium, who had been running the Bor Hospital, pulled out of the country amidst security concerns. Dr Samuel Legato Agat, a doctor at the hospital, was trained in Cuba and Canada, but most staff at the hospital as of 2012 were illiterate and incapable of producing documentation for patients. Kenya Commercial Bank (South Sudan) maintains a branch in Bor. The main transport connections are Bor Airport at Bor, in addition to river traffic on the White Nile and three major roads that lead out of Bor to other parts of South Sudan.

== Demographics ==
Jonglei State is inhabited mostly by Dinka (Monyjang/Jieng) and the Nuer people. The other ethnic groups include; Murle, Anuak, Jie, and Boya.

== Education ==
The John Garang Memorial University of Science and Technology, one of the seven public universities in the country, is located in Bor. The university is named after John Garang de Mabior.

Most of the educational institutions are concentrated in Bor, including number of best secondary schools in the country. Some of the leading schools in Bor are Alliance High School, Bor College, Greenbelt Academy, St. Andrew High School, and many more.

== Notable people ==
- Awer Mabil, South Sudanese-Australian footballer.
- Duop Thomas Reath, South Sudanese - Australian Basketball player.
- Samuel Gai Tut, South Sudan founding father.
- Adut Akech, South Sudanese-Australian model.
- Thomas Deng, South Sudanese-Australian footballer.
- Dr. John Garang De Mabior, South Sudan founding father.
- Michael Makuei Lueth, South Sudanese Politician.
- Kuol Manyang Juuk, South Sudanese Politician.
- John Bul Dau, Human right activist.
