= 2020 Greater Jonglei war =

- Part of Ethnic violence in South Sudan
| Date | February 18 - August 2020 |
| Location | Jonglei and Greater Pibor Administrative Area, South Sudan |
| Result | Partial Nuer-Dinka victory: Heavy flooding impacted Nuer-Dinka offensives |

Belligerents
| Lou Nuer: SPLM-IO fighters; Nuer White Army; SSPDF; 22nd Brigade soldiers; Bor Dinka: SSPDF / SPLM-IO; 8th Division soldiers; Titbaai; Gawaar Nuer | Murle: SSPDF; Eagle Battalion fighters; Military Intelligence supporters |

Strength
| 15,000 (February–March); 17,000 (June–August, per March 2021 U.N. report); 50,000 (June–August, per January 2021 U.N. report) | 7,000 (Pieri); 9,000 (Padoy) |

Casualties and losses
| Hundreds killed Hundreds injured | 400+ killed (May only); Hundreds injured |
- 1,058+ killed (Note: Total fighters and civilians killed and wounded, per U.N. March 2021 report. This toll is likely a severe undercount due to COVID-19 restrictions and inadequate healthcare infrastructure.); 686 women and children abducted 150,000+ displaced

Between February and August 2020, a large-scale war between Lou Nuer and Bor Dinka militias against Murle militias left at least 1,000 people dead and 150,000 displaced. The conflict took place in the Greater Jonglei region, comprising Jonglei State and the Greater Pibor Administrative Area. The conflict was one of the largest inter-communal violent conflicts since the signing of the R-ARCSS peace agreement.

== Background ==
The areas of Jonglei and Greater Pibor Administrative Area (GPAA) are located in central and eastern South Sudan, and have been hubs of conflict between local Nuer, Dinka, and Murle communities over land rights and herding. Local self-defense and cattle-raiding militias formed by these groups have been co-opted by warring parties throughout the South Sudanese Civil War in 2013 and 2018. The Bor Dinka are the largest ethnic group in the region, and live in Bor South county, Twic East County, and Duk County. Lou Nuer and Murle are both sizable minorities in the region; the Lou Nuer live in Nyirol, Akobo, and Uror, and the Murle live in Pibor County.

The Sudan People's Liberation Army (SPLA), the rebel group that fight the Sudanese government until South Sudanese independence, when it became the de facto South Sudanese army, historically supported the Bor Dinka, as John Garang was a Bor Dinka. The Nuer White Army, allied at times with the main rebel group Sudan People's Liberation Movement-in-Opposition (SPLM-IO), was also present in Jonglei, and had sizable Nuer support. The predominantly-Murle Cobra faction led by David Yau Yau launched a rebellion in 2012, which after negotiations led to the creation of the majority-Murle Greater Pibor Administrative Area (GPAA), which is considered at times to be part of the Greater Jonglei area.

The South Sudanese Civil War officially ended in 2018, but ethnic violence continued throughout Greater Jonglei between the Bor Dinka, Lou Nuer, and Murle. Despite the decrease in attacks and massacres by government forces and opposition militias, violence by community-based militias significantly increased and became the dominant cause of violence in Greater Jonglei. Rank and file members of the South Sudanese Army (SSPDF) and the SPLM-IO participated in the campaign.

== Prelude ==
Between December 2019 and January 2020, Lou Nuer community militias gathered in Walgak to discuss an impending attack on Murle communities in the following months. Further meetings took place in February 2020, where the militia leaders discussed which specific Murle communities and cattle camps to raid. Throughout this time, 10,000 Lou Nuer militiamen were mobilized in preparation for the raids, some blessed by a Nuer prophet. These militias were largely part of the Nuer White Army and the Dinka militias comprised some fighters in the Dinka militia Titbaai.

In February 2020, top Dinka and Nuer community leaders met in Poktap to set aside their differences and conduct joint operations against the Murle. The primary grievance both groups had against the Murle was that Murle communities, protected by armed Murle militias, were expanding their cattle-grazing areas into Lou Nuer and Bor Dinka territory. In the lead-up to President Kiir's announcement of the dissolution of Boma State despite keeping the GPAA, small groups of Murle men launched incursions into Nuer and Dinka communities (which were already mobilizing against the Murle).

Some of these incursions were armed attacks. These incursions took place between January and February 2020 in the Lou Nuer areas of Akobo, Nyirol, and Uror and in the Bor Dinka areas of Duk and Twic East.

== War ==
=== First offensive (February 18-March 3) ===
On February 18, Lou Nuer fighters gathered along the Nanaam River at Likuangole. The following day, they attacked Lokoromach payam and Gie payam and villages in those payams. Murle groups attempted to repel the Lou Nuer attacks at the village of Kirmith, but were defeated with heavy casualties on February 26. Around 800 Murle participated in the defense of the town, and dozens of me from the Lango age-set group were killed in the defense. Lou Nuer groups then took control of Likuangole and surrounding villages without resistance, probing villages along the Lilibok river until they retreated into their home counties on March 3.

At the same time as the February attacks by the Lou Nuer, Bor Dinka militiamen and Gawaar Nuer militiamen attacked the village of Bich-Bich on February 18, and then attacked the village of Thangnyang. A second group of allied Dinka-Gawaar Nuer militiamen attacked the village of Pakeny and then several more villages along the Nanaam river. Outnumbered Murle militiamen put up resistance against the Dinka-Gawaar Nuer attackers at Pakeny on February 25, forcing the former to flee the following day to Manyabol. Manyabol was a hub for Murle civilians fleeing the violence, and those who had heard about an impending offensive on February 27 fled up the Lothila river. They were chased by the Dinka-Gawaar Nuer attackers, and many women and children were abducted. Manyabol remained under Dinka-Gawaar Nuer control until March 3.

Around 15,000 Lou Nuer, Bor Dinka, and Gawaar Nuer militiamen participated in the attacks in February and March. At least 51 settlements were destroyed or attacked between February 18 and March 3. Both attacking militia groups abducted women and children, and stole cattle from the Murle. The exact number of casualties is not known from these attacks. A June 2020 United Nations report said that hundreds of civilians were killed, thousands of women and children abducted, and thousands of people displaced in the February attacks. A March 2021 United Nations report said that 346 total people, fighters and civilians, were killed. Another U.N. report in May 2020 said 220 civilians were killed.

OCHA in South Sudan, in its February 2020 report, said that 16,000 people were displaced in Akobo and Nyirol counties and 10,000 affected in Pibor. The majority of displaced civilians in Pibor took refuge in the UNMISS base in the town. The Red Cross treated at least 70 patients for gunshot wounds in Akobo, Ganyliel, and Juba. Médecins Sans Frontières' hospital in Lankien received 68 wounded. Katja Lorenz, the deputy director of the Red Cross in South Sudan, said that the majority of casualties could not be treated by the Red Cross, even by air, because of the threat of being shot at.

Between March 3 and May 16, little to no clashes occurred between the two sides, partially due to the COVID-19 pandemic. Starting on April 22, UNMISS went on a COVID-19 awareness campaign in Jonglei and the GPAA. Restrictions imposed on movement due to COVID-19 prevented authorities from identifying or retrieving civilians abducted during the first offensive. The Human Rights Division of UNMISS (HRD) reported that between April and June 2020, the number of civilians affected by violence across all of South Sudan decreased by 8% despite a 52% increase in the number of violent incidents. The war in Greater Jonglei comprised 20% of these incidents.

=== Pieri offensive (May 2020) ===
Murle militiamen organized themselves in May 2020 for a retaliatory attack on the Lou Nuer town of Pieri, under the control of the Riek Machar faction of SPLM-IO. Prior to this attack, Murle militiamen had a shaman pray over them, and some ethnic Murle SSPDF soldiers from the Eagle Battalion and former Cobra Faction soldiers took part in the mobilization. ACLED said that National Security Service (NSS) and SSPDF military intelligence provided weapons and intelligence to the Murle prior to the Pieri offensive. This local shaman was an influential religious-political leader known as a "red chief", and he sanctioned the Pieri attack because he had family members killed in the February attacks. Murle politicians publicly and privately supported the attack, and a Murle colonel was killed during the offensive. Many of the militiamen participated with the goal of retrieving abducted Murle women and children. About 7,000 Murle militiamen, almost entirely from Likuangole and the surrounding area participated in the Pieri attack.

On the morning of May 16, Murle militiamen attacked over 28 villages over a 25 kilometer radius in Uror County, surprising the Lou Nuer. The Murle offensive was very well-coordinated and many Lou Nuer defenders were killed. By the early afternoon, Lou Nuer soldiers in the SSPDF's 22nd Brigade in Waat and SPLM-IO fighters in Walgak, along with other Lou Nuer militiamen from Akobo East, Lankien, Motot, and Walgak arrived in Pieri to reinforce the Lou Nuer there. These reinforcements reversed the Murle offensive, and the Murle fighters were forced to retreat back to the GPAA. Murle fighters who became separated during the retreat were ambushed and killed between May 17 and 20.

The HRD reported that at least 121 civilians were killed during the Murle attack on Lou Nuer villages near Pieri. Another 24 were injured, and sixteen women and children were abducted. At least 400 fighters were killed during the May 16 attack and its aftermath. (Note: The HRD report does not distinguish whether the 400 fighters killed were Murle, Lou Nuer, or a combination of both.) The March 2021 U.N. report said that only 183 people were killed, both fighters and civilians, in the Pieri offensive. Al Jazeera said that 287 people had been killed, and at least 300 more had been injured. A January 2021 United Nations report said 211 civilians were killed and 300 were injured, along with 25 women and 48 children abducted. A June 2020 U.N. report said that hundreds (Note: The report says "hundreds of people", and does not distinguish between fighters and civilians.) were killed during the offensive, and thousands of civilians were displaced. Médecins Sans Frontières said on May 19 that they had treated 56 injuries from the Pieri area at the hospital in Lankien, but estimated many more could be dead and over 100 wounded in and around Pieri. The injured in Pieri were likely unable to access treatment, increasing the mortality rate from injuries. Two MSF personnel, of three present in Pieri, were injured in the offensive. One MSF worker was killed, along with two members of an unnamed humanitarian organization.

=== Maruwa Hills offensive (June–August) ===
In response to the Pieri offensive by the Murle on May 16, Dinka militias from Duk and Twic East along with Gawaar Nuer militias from Fangak, Ayod, and Piegi mobilized in Anyidi. Bor Dinka militias joined this mobilization as well. Very few Lou Nuer militiamen took part in this mobilization and subsequent attacks for more than a month due to the heavy losses sustained in Pieri. About 17,000 Dinka, Gawaar Nuer, and Lou Nuer took part in these attacks. In June, Dinka and Gawaar Nuer fighters declared a no-fly zone over the GPAA, threatening to shoot down a UNMISS helicopter.

A Murle raid in May, involving 9,000 Murle militiamen, took place in Padoy, Akobo County, which is a Lou Nuer area. At least 370 people were killed in this massacre, and another 50 were injured. Some Lou Nuer tried to defend themselves but did not succeed.

The first attacks began on Gumuruk and Manyabol, which were besieged by the Dinka-Gawaar Nuer alliance between June 11 and July 7. In an attack on Gumuruk, the local hospital was burnt and food storage facilities were burned. Almost all of Gumuruk's population fled, and 140 women and children were kidnapped, along with 175,000 head of cattle. On July 7, the Dinka-Gawaar Nuer alliance pushed further east, engaging in battle with Murle militias in the Maruwa Hills east of Pibor and in the town of Verteth. Both Verteth and the Maruwa Hills are located deep in the GPAA. The Dinka and Gawaar Nuer abducted women, children, and cattle on their march to the Maruwa Hills. The march to the Maruwa Hills was reinforced by a Lou Nuer offensive along the Nanaam river and Likuangole that began on July 8 and lasted till July 10. The Lou Nuer destroyed several villages and killed some civilians. (Note: Verbatim, "These groups then attacked Likuangole, leading to casualties, destruction of property and displacement of local populations.") Like their Dinka-Gawaar Nuer allies, the Lou Nuer abducted women, children, and cattle. Many women were sexually abused and raped by the attackers.

The Lou Nuer returned to Akobo on July 17, leaving their allies stranded in the Maruwa Hills. Some more Nuer returned in the last week of July. Some armed Dinka were ferried from Bor to Lafon County to open a new front, but this new front never materialized. The rainy season and resulting heavy flooding in the area forced the Dinka and Gawaar Nuer to retreat back to Jonglei by early August. While these groups were pillaging the GPAA, small bands of Murle fighters raided towns in Jonglei, conducting at least ten attacks between June and early August.

While these groups were pillaging the GPAA, small bands of Murle fighters raided towns in Jonglei, conducting at least ten attacks between June and early August. In one Murle raid on the village of Yuay in Jonglei, Murle militiamen stormed the village and began abducting children. Any children that did not go with the Murle were killed. Women fleeing the village were raped, and all civilian homes were burned.

== Peace talks and cessation of violence ==
After the Pieri offensive, South Sudanese government officials began focusing on the Greater Jonglei war and attempted to enact peace talks. On June 23, President Kiir formed a 13-person High-Level Committee to determine the roots of the violence in Jonglei and GPAA. No SPLM-IO members were on this committee. By the end of June, however, no action had been taken by this committee.

HLC leader Wani Igga convinced Dinka elders and notables to retreat from the GPAA and stop attacking Murle civilians on July 22. This was successful, and the Dinka retreated shortly afterward. On July 12, Jonglei investigator Nyang Chuol Dhuor called on Lou Nuer to return to Jonglei from Pibor. United Nations-backed dialogue in September between Lou Nuer, Dinka, and Murle community leaders helped end the violence. The United Nations, in a March 2021 report, phrased the war as lasting from January to August 2020. The heavy flooding is considered a leading cause for the cessation of the violence.

One of the primary analyses reported by the United Nations is how much planning and organization went into the attacks in the war on all sides. The Murle, Dinka, and Nuer had planned out attacks months prior to them taking place, and successfully mobilized thousands of fighters into conducting widespread attacks. This level of organization and coordination was unprecedented for communal conflicts in Jonglei.

=== Government and SPLM-IO involvement ===
South Sudanese soldiers stationed in the area did not respond to the majority of the violence during the war. Some SSPDF soldiers were dispatched to Likuangole on February 25, but the main objective of the soldiers was to protect Pibor town from any violence. Throughout the rest of the war, the SSPDF remained in Pibor. UNMISS did protect around 200 Murle civilians in Manyabol during the Dinka attack from Anyidi. The March 2021 United Nations report noted that prominent Dinka, Nuer, and Murle politicians and commanders stoked the violence and took sides with their ethnic communities, although no names were mentioned in the report.

Along with the NSS and SSPDF's Military Intelligence and Eagle Battalion supporting the Murle, the 8th Division (Note: It is unclear whether the 8th Division is SSPDF or SPLM-IO. The ACLED report says "Dinka from SSPDF Division 8 (stationed near Bor)" and the U.N. report says "the SPLA-IO 8th Division from Bor".) stationed near Bor participated in the fighting and gave weapons to Bor Dinka militias. Lt. Thomas Duoth, head of the external wing of the NSS, gave weapons to Lou and Gawaar Nuer militias to be used in attacks against the Murle. Murle raids included men dressed in military and civilian clothes.

Dan Watson, writing in ACLED, said that the South Sudanese government permitted political, economic, and military leaders from various government institutions and the SPLM-IO to support opposing sides in the war and assist in planning the attacks on rival communities. According to Watson, the main person that could have benefitted from these actions is President Salva Kiir, as has happened in previous intra-ethnic conflicts. The International Crisis Group supported this conclusion, as the Dinka and Murle financial and political backers were within Kiir's camp of the government. The war significantly weakened the Murle as a political and military force, and dealt serious damage to communities affiliated with the SPLA-IO.

=== Casualties ===
The March 2021 report said that more than 1,058 people from Murle, Nuer, and Dinka communities were killed or wounded between January and August. At least 686 women and children, mostly Murle, were abducted and at least 39 were raped. Additionally, 86,000 cattle, about $30 million worth, were stolen. These numbers are likely a severe undercount due to COVID-19 movement restrictions, severe flooding in September, and inadequate healthcare infrastructure exacerbating mortality rates. Human Rights Watch said that 150,000 people had been displaced as a result of the war. Dinka in Jonglei interviewed said that the quality of life and safety of their communities had decreased significantly since 2018.

Sexual violence was employed during the war by both sides in nearly every incident. A Murle woman from Gumuruk said that she was raped by Gawaar Nuer and Bor Dinka assailants for ten consecutive days during the pillaging of Gumuruk in May. Murle fighters raped women en masse while fleeing, and simply murdered pregnant women instead of raping them. An abducted woman who escaped captivity walked two days back to her home to escape her Lou Nuer captors. Some abducted women and children were brought to Bor. Child soldiers were employed by all sides, with boys as young as 15 participating in the massacres.
