= 2025 Nasir clashes =

Clashes in Nasir, South Sudan

Coordinates: 08°36′25″N 33°02′38″E

Nasir clashes
- Part of the aftermath of the South Sudanese Civil War
Date	3 March – 20 April 2025 (1 month, 2 weeks and 3 days)
Location	Nasir, Nasir County, South Sudan
Result	SSPDF evacuates Nasir

Belligerents
Nuer White Army	South Sudan; Uganda (9 March–1 April)	(United Nations) UNMISS

Commanders and leaders
Ter Chuol Gatkuoth	Maj. Gen. David Majur Dak †	Nicholas Haysom; Lt. General Mohan Subramanian

Casualties and losses
more than 40 killed 77 wounded	257 killed 16 wounded	1 helicopter crew member killed, 2 wounded
- 50,000 people displaced

Clashes broke out in the South Sudanese town of Nasir between members of the South Sudan People's Defence Forces (SSPDF) and the Nuer White Army on 3 March 2025. Tensions between the town's garrison and local forces, heightened by the arrival of government-backed militia, led the White Army to overrun the army barracks. During an attempt to evacuate the remaining SSPDF troops, helicopters belonging to the United Nations Mission in South Sudan came under fire, resulting in significant casualties.

In response, the government of South Sudan and Ugandan forces conducted airstrikes on villages in Nasir, Longechuk, and Ulang counties. With the cooperation of local leaders, the SSPDF peacefully retook Nasir on 20 April 2025.

The clashes have had major political consequences, leading to the arrest of dozens of politicians affiliated with the Sudan People's Liberation Movement-in-Opposition (SPLA-IO)—which the government accuses of supporting the Nuer White Army—and raised concerns that the country might return to civil war. The First Vice President of South Sudan and leader of the SPLA-IO, Riek Machar, was stripped of his authority and placed on trial due to charges relating to the clashes.

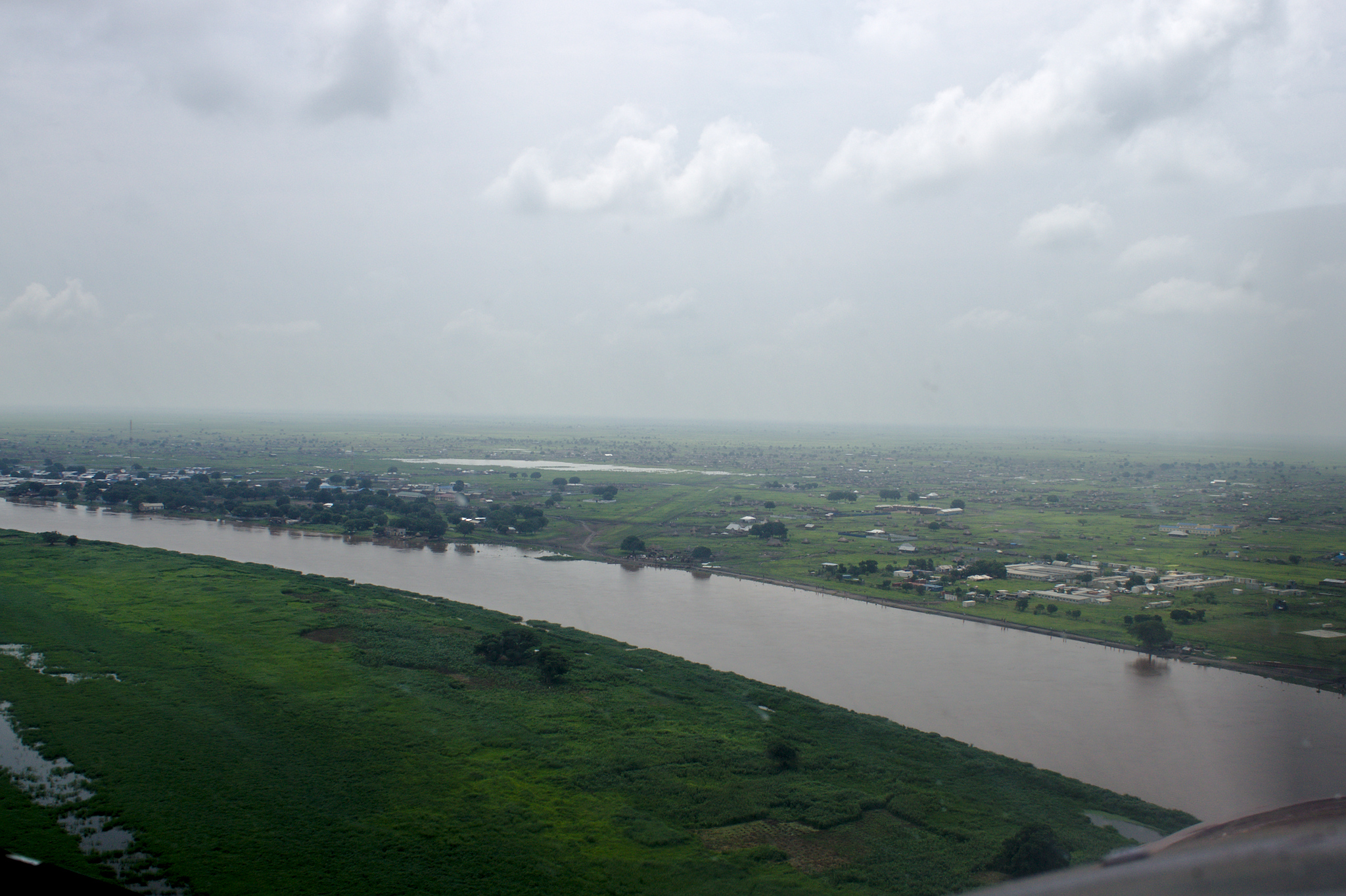
The town of Nasir pictured in 2013, with the Sobat River in the foreground and the Nasir Airstrip in the background.

== Background ==
The town of Nasir is located on the Sobat River in Upper Nile State, 26 km (16 mi) from the border with Ethiopia. The Nuer people are the primary inhabitants, and the town was a stronghold of the Nuer-majority Sudan People's Liberation Army-in-Opposition (SPLA-IO) during the South Sudanese Civil War. The town was largely destroyed when captured by government forces in May 2014, and was retaken by SPLA-IO forces in July 2014.

Even after the signing of the R-ARCSS—the agreement that ended the civil war—in 2018, tensions in Nasir remained high. On 10–11 February 2024, clashes broke out between White Army members and soldiers with the South Sudan People's Defence Forces (SSPDF) after a dispute involving fishing nets, leaving several dead. On 14–15 February 2025, four SSPDF soldiers were killed when White Army members attacked a group collecting firewood; at least 10 civilians were injured in the resultant shelling. The White Army has protested the SSPDF presence in the town, calling for Necessary Unified Forces (NUF) to replace the soldiers, who are perceived as partisan. The government stated that no NUF were available, instead deploying Shilluk Agwelek Forces and Padang Dinka militia to Nasir. These groups were perceived as hostile by the local Nuer, and their barges were fired upon by White Army members as they traveled to Nasir on 22 February.

== Conflict ==
=== Initial clashes and the SSPDF evacuation ===
Around 4 p.m. on 3 March, a White Army member was killed by the SSPDF, sparking clashes which continued until Tuesday evening. White Army members secured the town of Nasir as well as occupying part of the Wec Yar Adiu army barracks located around 3 km (2 mi) west of the town before retreating due to a shortage of ammunition. The barracks were captured by a renewed White Army on 4 March. On 5 March, the White Army and the government agreed to allow the SSPDF troops to be airlifted out of Nasir using UNMISS helicopters; however, the evacuation was delayed until 7 March, and the SSPDF soldiers took refuge in armed vehicles. When the two helicopters arrived, an exchange of fire with the White Army led to the death of one of the UNMISS helicopter operators, 27 SSPDF soldiers, and the commander of the garrison, Majur Dak. In the aftermath of the evacuation attempt, the remaining SSPDF soldiers fled to surrounding areas, with 15 soldiers going to Ulang County.

The fall of the garrison resulted in the capture or destruction of SSPDF military equipment valued at US$58.7 million, including mortar units, 557 AK-47 rifles, and 7 armoured personnel carriers.

=== Airstrikes ===
In response to the clashes, Uganda deployed special forces to Juba on 9 March. Muhoozi Kainerugaba, the Ugandan Chief of Defence Forces, announced the deployment on X, stating, "We the UPDF, only recognise ONE President of South Sudan, H.E. Salva Kiir ... Any move against him is a declaration of war against Uganda!" Muhoozi ordered the UPDF to halt its attacks on 1 April.

On 16 March, at 11:40 p.m., the SSPDF conducted airstrikes around the Nasir airstrip, killing 21 residents. The day after the airstrike, information minister Michael Makuei Lueth ordered civilians to evacuate the military zone. Around 3:30 a.m. on 19 March, additional airstrikes targeted the town, including the Nasir market, injuring two civilians.

Airstrikes also occurred in the surrounding areas. The village of Mathiang in Longechuk County was struck on 16 March, leaving one dead and eight injured. On March 18, airstrikes occurred on the road between Akobo and Walgak. One person was killed and 12 were wounded in Kuich, Ulang County, after airstrikes on 21 March.

=== Recapture of Nasir ===
With coordination from local leaders, the White Army executed a "tactical withdrawal" from Nasir on 20 April, allowing SSPDF forces to peacefully reoccupy the town. SSPDF spokesperson Lul Ruai Koang stated that the army's operations against the White Army had concluded with the town's recapture. The following day, Paul Nang Majok, the Chief of Defense Forces, visited Nasir to congratulate the troops.

== Aftermath and political consequences ==
=== Political detentions ===
In the aftermath of the clashes, several politicians associated with the SPLM-IO were put under house arrest. On 4 March, General Gabriel Duop Lam, the chief of staff for the SPLM-IO was arrested on unspecified charges, and around midnight on 5 March, Puot Kang Chol, the minister of petroleum, was arrested in Juba. SSPDF soldiers also surrounded the home of First Vice President Riek Machar. On 6 March, Stephen Par Kuol, the minister of peacebuilding, was arrested in his office; he was released on the morning of 7 March.

On 19 March, President Salva Kiir appointed James Koang Chuol, a lieutenant general from Nasir, as the governor of Upper Nile State, replacing the SPLA-IO-affiliated governor James Odhok Oyai.

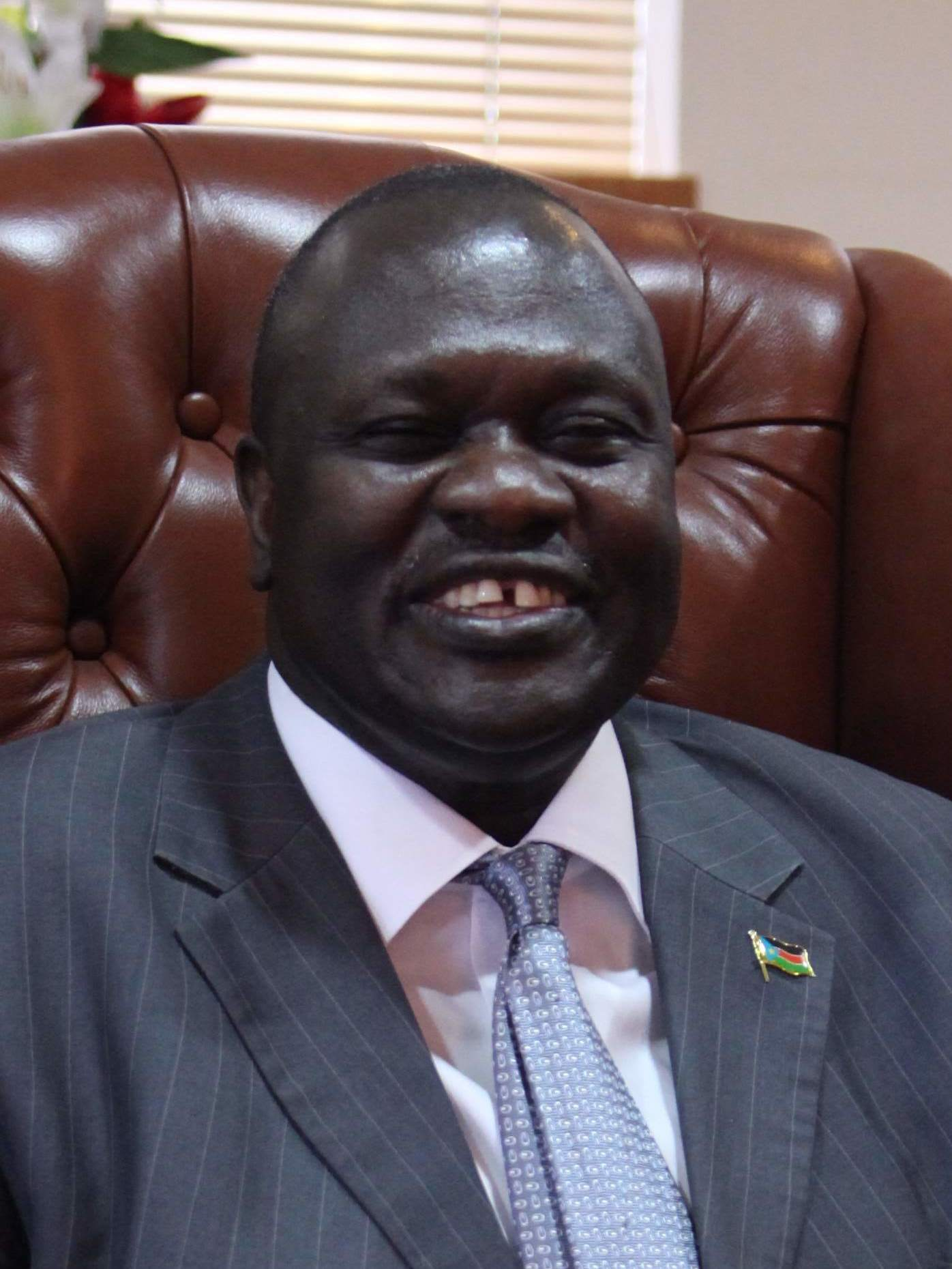
Riek Machar (pictured in 2012) is accused by the government of ordering the attack on Nasir, which he denies.

=== Trial of Riek Machar ===
The First Vice President of South Sudan and leader of the SPLA-IO, Riek Machar, was placed under house arrest during the clashes. On 11 September 2025, Machar—along with seven co-defendants—was charged with murder, treason and crimes against humanity, with the government alleging that Machar ordered the White Army attack on Nasir, which Machar denies. Along with the charges, Machar was suspended from the vice presidency. The trial began on 22 September and was seen as a major test of the 2018 peace agreement, with allegations that the trial is intended to disqualify Machar from running in the 2026 South Sudanese general election. As of 1 February 2026, the trial is still ongoing.

Observers have noted that the Nuer White Army is an "amalgamation of community militias" rather than a force commanded by the SPLA-IO. A report by Small Arms Survey based on interviews with White Army members found that "Riek Machar and the leadership of the Sudan People’s Liberation Movement/Army-in-Opposition (SPLM/A-IO) were not responsible for the March 2025 assault on the SSPDF barracks in the town of Nasir. The central argument of the GRSS’s legal team, which is prosecuting Machar and his associates in Juba, is unfounded."

== Reactions ==
The Intergovernmental Authority on Development (IGAD) expressed concern over the clashes, urging the parties to reaffirm their commitment to the R-ARCSS peace agreement.

On 9 March, the United States Department of State ordered all non-essential personal to leave South Sudan due to the clashes and increased political tension. On 22 March, Germany announced that it would temporarily close its embassy in the country due to the deteriorating security situation; Norway subsequently announced the closure of its embassy on 26 March. The German and Norwegian embassies reopened on 9 June 2025.
