= Guek Ngundeng =

Nuer people's prophet and spiritual leader

Guek Ngundeng (1890 – 1929) was a Nuer people's prophet and spiritual leader proclaimed seizure by the spirit of Deng (sky God) divinity and a son of the Nuer people's prophet Ngundeng Bong. He was known to the Angelo-Egyptian colonial government in Sudan as a witch doctor. He helped rebuild the Ngundeng Pyramid a few years after his father's death. He fought the colonial government in their campaigns to demolish the Pyramid and was eventually killed in action in 1929.

In 1929, the Anglo-Egyptian colonial government in Sudan dispatched police and military operations under the Nuer district commissioner Percy Coriat to what was known as the "Nuer Settlement" in Upper Nile province. The event proceeded with the machinations of young Nuer prophet Guek Ngundeng, known to the colonial administration as a witch doctor, the son of the Nuer prophet Ngundeng Bong.

== Biography ==
Guek Ngundeng was believed to have been born in 1890 in Wech Deng village, Nyirol County of Lou Nuer territory today part of Jonglei State, South Sudan. His father Ngundeng Bong, a Nuer prophet, was from Lou Nuer and his mother Nyaduong Duoth hailed from Eastern Jikany Nuer. After the demise of Prophet Ngundeng in 1906, Ngundeng's followers believed that Deng's divinity would possess Ngundeng's elder son Reath to carry on his father's work. Still, his little brother Guek happened to be the one who proclaimed seizure by his father's spirit of Deng divinity.

The colonial administration carried out a military campaign against Guek and the other two Lou prophets Puok Kerjiok and Char Koryom in 1917. In 1920 the government heard rumors that Guek was planning a rebellion. In 1921, H. C. Jackson, the Deputy Governor of the upper Nile province visited Guek and Ngundeng Pyramid in Wech Deng and found out that the allegations against Guek were false. Guek was cleared of the charges of rebellion, but he followed his father's reluctance to deal directly with government officials.

C.A. Willis, the new governor of Upper Nile Province and the then commander in chief of the Anglo-Egyptian Sudan military proposed building the road connecting Lou Nuer territory to Bor district, a Dinka territory. Guek refused to provide labor for a road-building scheme. Percy Coriat, the Nuer district commissioner shared a meeting with Lou Nuer chiefs where he explained to each chief what their responsibility is and the amount of labor required of them. Again, Guek objected to the labor. Willis interpreted Guek's objection to road work as "anti-government" propaganda.

Following Guek's fallout with the colonial government, Dok Dieng, the Lou Nuer chief contacted the government several times in 1927 in an effort for reconciliation. In his first letter, he urged Coriat to sit down with Guek again about the road project, but Coriat refused. He then visited Coriat in Abwong where he presented an elephant tusk to Coriat as a gift from Guek and appealed that Guek had no intention to fight the government. The third time, he took a delegation with him including Guek's little brother Bol to Abwong, Coriat assured them that he didn't appreciate Guek's conduct so he told Dok Dieng that they would meet in a few days to settle the road project matter and all the Lou chiefs and Guek must be presence and to ensure that the meeting happens, he held Guek's little brother in detention.

In 1928, four planes of the Royal Air Force carrying 20-pound bombs were sent to destroy the Pyramid in Wech Deng which resulted in Pyramid's partial demolition. following the Royal Air Force raid, the government in Khartoum announced to the world that the Ngundeng Pyramid was "destroyed completely". By January 1929 another government troops were sent to Wech Deng and encountered Guek leading large numbers of spear-carrying Nuer warriors dancing at the base of the Pyramid. Guek gave water to the warriors to drink and told them that the water would make them immune to bullets. The warriors advanced toward the government troops, singing and driving Guek's white bull before them. When they had reached closer, the troops opened a withering fire that dispersed the Nuer. Guek's dead body, drum(bul), rod(dang), and brass pipe(tony) were found beside the slain white bull.

== See also ==
- Deng Laka – Nuer People's prophet
