= Percy Coriat =

British colonial officer (1898-1960)

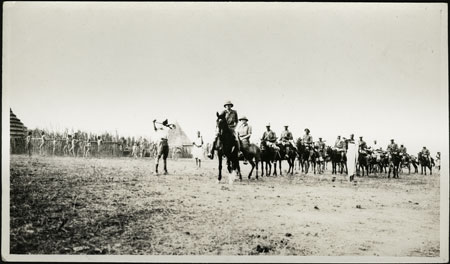
Percy Coriat leading a military patrol in Upper Nile (taken by Charles Kingsley Meek, circa 1928)

Percy Coriat DCM (1898–1960) was a British colonial officer in Anglo-Egyptian Sudan, an administrator among the Nuer, and, the first British official who became fully conversant in Nuer Language.

== Biography ==
Coriat was born in 1898 and dropped out of school in 1914 at the age of 16 to join the British military. He joined the Sudan Political Service in 1922 and served as District Commissioner in Nuerland from 1922 to 1931. During his 10 years as a District Commissioner among the Nuer, he married a Nuer wife, for whom he swapped entire bridewealth livestock, and became the first British official to become fully conversant in Nuer.

Coriat was the first administrator who could be called an authority on the Nuer after obtaining local Nuer relatives and acquaintances, and he, like many others in his administrative post, imposed colonial authority on the Nuer. Coriat was a Political Officer on a patrol dispatched to the Gaawar Nuer in 1928. He also participated in campaigns against the Lou Nuer from 1928 to 1929. From 1929 to 1931, he served as District Commissioner for the Western Nuer (Homeland Nuer).

Coriat ordered the destruction of the Ngundeng Pyramid in Lou Nuer territory in Southern Sudan in 1928, shortly after photographing it. The pyramid was built by the Nuer Prophet Ngundeng Bong and his son Gwek and was a prominent symbol of Nuer's resistance to British control. In 1929, Coriat led an offensive raid that killed Gwek Ngundeng near the pyramid in Wec Deng village.

By the end of his reign among the Nuer, Coriat had ruled all Nuer except the Eastern Jikany. Coriat spent time in El Obeid briefly before moving on to other parts of Sudan until 1948. His photographs, donated to the Pitt Rivers Museum, depict his stations and travels in Sudan/South Sudan.

In 1930, Coriat received the Distinguished Conduct Medal (DCM), awarded in the King's Birthday Honours.
