= Disarmament of the Lou Nuer =

- Part of the Sudanese nomadic conflicts
Date	December 2005 – 18 May 2006 (5 months)
Location	Northern Jonglei State
Result	SPLA victory

Belligerents
(South Sudan) Southern Sudan: (South Sudan) SPLA	Lou Nuer White Army; SSDF forces of Thomas Maboir; SSDF forces of Simon Gatwitch; Supported by: Sudan

Commanders and leaders
(South Sudan) Peter Bol Kong (South Sudan) George Athor	Simon Wojong

Strength
3,000-9,000	6,000-20,000

Casualties and losses
400-700	1,200
- 213 civilians killed

The disarmament of the Lou Nuer was a forcible disarmament campaign undertaken by the SPLA in Southern Sudan in December 2005. While other groups had been peacefully disarmed, the Lou section of the Nuer in Northern Jonglei State refused to comply. The SPLA organized a force under Peter Bol Kong to forcibly disarm the Lou Nuer, whose White Army resisted until a defeat in the battle of Motot, after which they fled the area.

== Background ==
While the Comprehensive Peace Agreement that ended the Second Sudanese Civil War in January 2005 called for the disarmament of other armed groups, it had little guidance on disarming civilians. However, the SPLM, the major political party in Southern Sudan, decided to disarm civilians in order to reduce ethnic violence, reserve the right to bear arms for the party, eliminate armed groups backed by Sudan, and ensure the security of its territory before challenging Sudan on border issues. Disarmament started in Western Jonglei State and moved east, with the lightly armed Dinka and later the Jikan Nuer disarming relatively peacefully. In late 2005, the SPLA assigned Gen. Peter Bol Kong, a Lou Nuer with an ethnically mixed force, to disarm the Lou Nuer.

In December, the pastoral Lou and Gawaar Nuer asked the Dinka in Duk County permission to graze on their lands. However, unlike previous years, the Dinka insisted that the Lou and Gawaar disarm before coming in their territories. A series of meetings began in Khorfulus County where the Jonglei State government said that the groups needed to either join the SPLA or turn their weapons in, or else they would be forcibly disarmed. The Jonglei governor also promised compensation for the weapons, but it was unclear were the funding would come from or who it would go to. The meetings were long, and the mediators consumed approximately 1,300 of the Lou Nuer's cattle. The Lou Nuer refused to disarm, saying they needed their weapons for protection from the Murle, who had not been disarmed. Skirmishes began between the Lou Nuer and the SPLA.

== The Disarmament Campaign ==
A map of Jonglei state. Most of the fighting occurred in Uror County (УРОР). Motot (Мвот Тот) is also shown.

At the end of January 2006, the White Army forces launched a major attack on the SPLA which left about 60 dead. In the mayhem, hundreds of SPLA forces were scattered into the dry lands and died of hunger and thirst. Wutnyang Gatkek, a Gawaar Nuer spiritual leader and a former influential white army member was killed when he went to Yuai on behalf of the SPLA to promote disarmament. His death and the deaths of SPLA soldiers led to demands for a swift and hard military response. The Security Committee of the Government of Southern Sudan met and was split, with the leader of the SPLM, Salva Kiir, wanting restraint and with Riek Machar, a Nuer, wanting a rapid response. Machar's side won, and Gen. Peter Bol Kong was given a free hand to disarm the Lou Nuer. Major battles began with Bol Kong's disarmament forces fighting the White Army, the forces of Thomas Maboir (though Maboir did not fight), and a section of the SSDF forces of Simon Gatwitch under his deputy Simon Wojong. A conference was held from February 27 to March 7 in Yuai with the White Army and leading figures of the Government of Southern Sudan in another attempt to get the Lou Nuer to peacefully disarm. Riek Machar, regarded as the founder of the White Army, announced its dissolution, but the youth were determined to keep their arms.

From April to May there were frequent sightings of a helicopter arriving at Simon Wojong's camp near Yuai, and it was concluded that this was a Sudanese Armed Forces helicopter bringing supplies. By May 2006, the Lou Nuer economy was in tatters and many White Army fighters had lost most of their cattle. Peter Bol Kong arrived in the Motot area on May 16. After some skirmishes with the White Army and Simon Wojong's forces, the battle of Motot occurred on May 18, in which 113 White Army fighters were killed to just one SPLA soldier killed. The White Army and the forces of Thomas Maboir fled north, heavy looting cattle and property from the local population. The SPLA also looted the fleeing forces. Simon Gatwitch claimed to have ordered his forces north as well to avoid conflict with the SPLA, and they reached Dolip Hill. The military campaign was over.

== Aftermath ==
On May 20 Peter Bol Kong called together local authorities, and disarmament began and lasted for two months. The disarmament collected more than 3,000 weapons and was claimed to be 95 percent effective. In the next place in line for disarmament, Akobo, Akobo Commissioner Doyak Choal, shocked by the violence to the east, quickly organized a disarmament led by traditional leaders without the involvement of the SPLA. The Akobo disarmament was successful and turned out 1,400 weapons.

About 400 SPLA soldiers and 1,200 White Army fighters died in the disarmament of the Lou Nuer. The SPLA burned the huts of White Army members, so about 1,000 huts were burned. The violence made it so the locals could not plant and the SPLA was not supplied with food so it had to live off the locals' animals, creating serious food shortages after the conflict. The White Army was defeated, but it would later be reformed and again challenge the SPLA.

Meanwhile, SPLA commander George Athor used many of the guns confiscated from the Lou Nuer to arm his own private army, launching his own uprising in 2010.
