= Yuai =

- Town
- Location of Yuai in South Sudan
- Coordinates: 7°54′N 31°53′E
- Country: South Sudan
- State: Jonglei State
- County: Uror County

Yuai is the capital of Uror County, Jonglei State in the Greater Upper Nile region of South Sudan. It is the most populous place in Uror County. It has historically been associated with the Nuer White Army.

== History ==
Yuai was a garrison of the SPLA-Nasir during the Second Sudanese Civil War. It was attacked by the SPLA in 1993.

Yuai was one of the Lou Nuer areas where fighting occurred during the forced disarmament of the Lou Nuer in 2006. A conference was held in Yuai from February 27 to March 7 to convince the Lou Nuer to disarm, but it was unsuccessful.

After the outbreak of the South Sudanese Civil War, Yuai quickly came under the control of the SPLA-IO. On December 20, 2013, two UNMISS helicopters were fired on by anti-government forces when evacuating military personnel and internally displaced persons in Yuai. One of the helicopters was damaged. The deteriorating security caused the United Nations to relocate its personnel from Yuai. By August 2014, there were 14,000 internally displaced persons in the Yuai area. In August 2016, SPLM-IO officials detained a charted Kenyan chartered plane when it landed in Yuai. In February 2017, Yuai, which had been peaceful throughout the South Sudanese Civil War, began experiencing clashes. The SPLA took Yuai without heavy fighting on February 15, 2017, but the SPLA-IO launched unsuccessful an attack to retake the town the next morning. The SPLA-IO attacked Yuai on March 12, 2017 but was repulsed. The SPLA-IO claimed to have killed 93 and destroyed a tank and two other military vehicles while losing 5 killed and 9 wounded in the attack, while the SPLA claimed they killed 23 and injured 50 without any losses. There was fighting between the SPLA and SPLA-IO around Yuai from April 12–13, 2017. Médecins Sans Frontières reported in June 2017 that 27,000 people had fled Yuai and Waat since February of that year.

Yuai was part of Jonglei State until the reorganization of states in 2015, in which Yuai became part of Eastern Bieh State. Eastern Bieh State was later renamed Bieh State. Since 2020 it is again part of the reconstituted Jonglei State.
