= Jikany Nuer =

Ethnic group in South Sudan

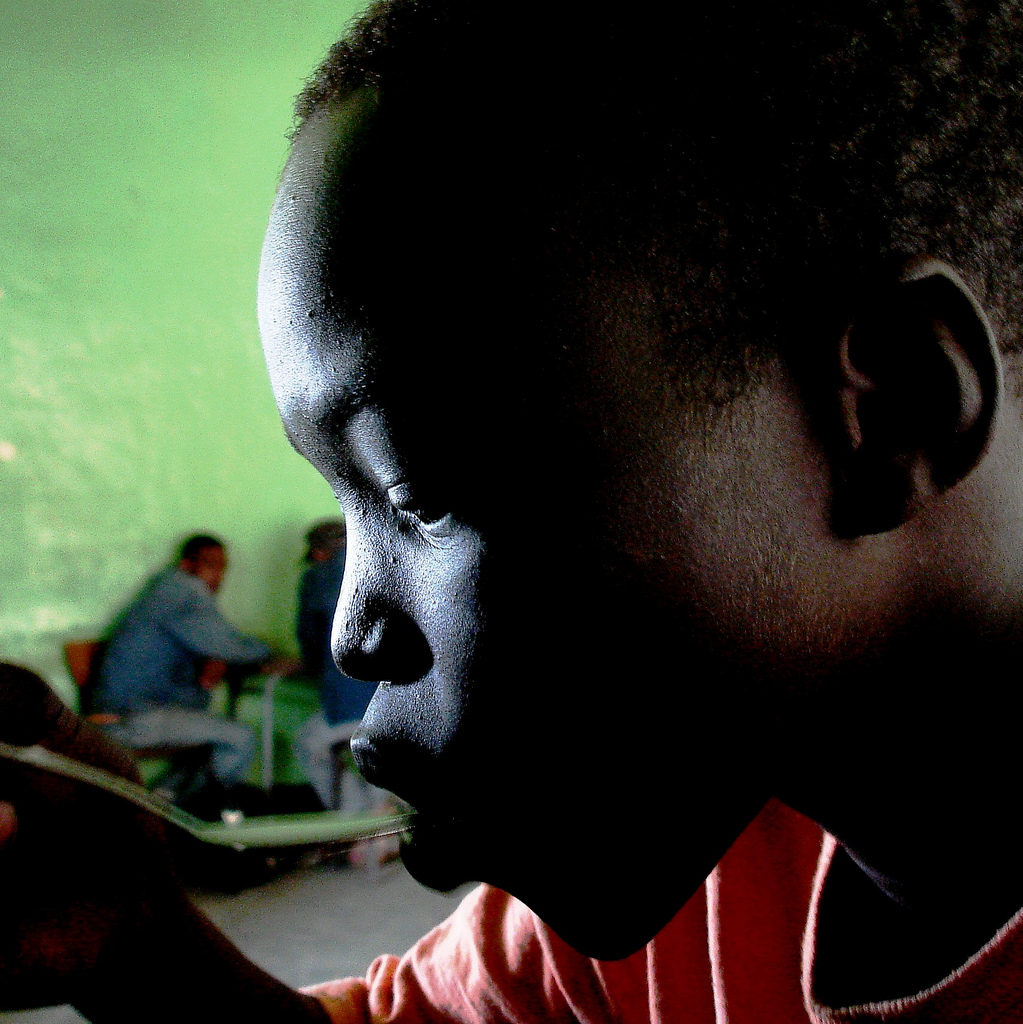
Nuer boy

The Jikany Nuer are a section of the Nuer people who mainly live in the eastern part of Upper Nile state in South Sudan, particularly around Nasir in Nasir County.

== Civil war ==
During the Second Sudanese Civil War (1983–2005), between 1993 and 2004 the Lou Nuer and Jikany Nuer of Nasir County were in violent conflict. After that time, relations between the two groups were calmer until 2009, when they deteriorated sharply.

Gordon Kong Chuol belongs to the Jikany Nuer and comes from Nasir. He became a militia leader of Thourjikany Forces, and a major-general in Anya Nya II in 1988. He then became a commander and a member of the political and military high command of the SPLM/A. In August 1991 Riek Machar, Lam Akol and Gordon Kong announced that John Garang had been ejected from the SPLM. The breakaway faction, based in Nasir until 1995 and then in Waat and Ayod, was called the SPLM/A-Nasir faction from 1991 to 1993.

In the first part of 1994, Gordon Kong became involved in a quarrel between Lou Nuer from Waat and Jikany Nuer in Nasir over fishing rights in the Sobat River. As commander of Waat and Nasir, Gordon Kong was ordered by Riek Machar to defend Nasir. Instead Gordon Kong left Nasir and launched an attack on Lou civilians. In response, the Lou called in Gordon Kong Banypiny for help, and he led a force of Lou men to Nasir, which they burned. Riek Machar arrested the commanders who had become involved in this fighting between SSIA sections and put them up for trial. Some were sentenced to imprisonment and others to death. Later they were pardoned.

== See also ==
- 2009 Sobat River ambush
