= White Army (disambiguation) =

The White Army or White armies are common collective names for the armed formations of the White movement and anti-Soviet governments during the Civil War in Russia (1917–1923)

The term may also refer to:

- Saudi Arabian National Guard
- Nuer White Army, a semi-organised militancy of Nuer youths in South Sudan in east-central Africa after its secession and independence in 2011 from Sudan in the north
- White Guard (Finland), which constituted the bulk of the White Army, Finnish government forces in the Finnish Civil War (January–May 1918)
