= Ngundeng Pyramid =

Pyramid in Nuerland (1870–1928)

- Bi̱ɛh Ŋundɛŋ
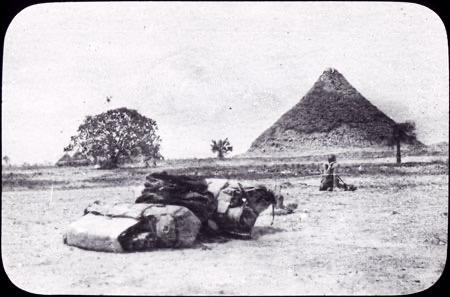
- Ngundeng Pyramid in 1901 by Dr Edward Smyth Crispin
- Type: Holy Site
- Cultures: Nuer people
- Location: Wec Deng, Nyirol County, Jonglei State, South Sudan
- Region: Nuerland

History
- Built: 1870
- Abandoned: 1928

Site notes
- Height: 50–60 feet
- Circumference: 300 feet

Ngundeng Pyramid (Thok Naath: Bi̱ɛh ŋundɛŋ or Yi̱k, Arabic: هرم نغوندنغ), also known as Pyramid of Dengkur, was a large mound shrine constructed by the Nuer people's prophet Ngundeng Bong (died 1906) at the end of the nineteenth century and added to by his son Guek Ngundeng (died 1929). The Ngundeng Pyramid, which was around 300 feet in circumference and 50 to 60 feet tall, cone-shaped, and encircled by a row of elephant tusks, was a symbol of the Nuer people's resistance to colonialism. The monument was dynamited on the orders of British colonial commander Percy Coriat in 1928, shortly after the first attempt to demolish it failed.

The construction of the Ngundeng Pyramid was believed to have begun in 1870 and was completed in four years in stages. The first phase began with the construction of huts for Ngundeng's followers, who are the builders, which lasted one year; The second phase, which was the building phase, lasted two years; and the final stage, in which the Prophet Ngundeng fasted for seven days and summoned all Nuer from Nuerland to assemble in his village, lasted one year. For a four-year period, thousands of Nuer worked under the prophet's supervision building the Pyramid. Unlike the Nubian Pyramids in Northern Sudan, the Ngundeng Pyramid/Pyramid of Dengkur was constructed entirely of ash, animal dung, cotton soil, and clay—not a single stone or brick was used.

== Purpose ==
According to the Nuer, Ngundeng built it to honor his God, Dengtath (God of Creation), as well as to serve as a sanctuary and place of worship for the Nuer people. One of the prime examples was when Gaajiok(section of Eastern Jikany Nuer) women were once smitten with childlessness, and for many years they bore no male children. Finally, they undertook pilgrimages to the Ngundeng Pyramid in Lou Nuer territory, which had already established a reputation for holiness. They brought with them gifts of ivory tusks, beads, calves for slaughter, and so on, and it was at this time that the vast collection of tusks, embedded in the earth encircling the mound and gracing its top, was collected. Their prayers were answered, and they bore children again.

According to Percy Coriat, an administrator among the Nuer, and the first British official who became fluent in the Nuer language, the pyramid was built because the Nuer were plagued by smallpox and rinderpest, which were unknown to them at the time. Nuer believed that the pandemic had something to do with the earth or land. Prophet Ngundeng devised the notion of hiding these plagues beneath the ground. After the pyramid was completed and the sacrifice was made, the sicknesses stopped and did not occur again.

== Demolition ==
The Anglo-Egyptian army had taken control of the Sudan in 1898, it was not until 1916 that patrols were sent into Nuerland. By 1918, Guek Ngundeng, the son of Prophet Ngundeng who was possessed by Deng divinity (Sky God) after his father's death, was leading massive raids against the Dinka, bearing his pipe, magical spear, and a white bull. During one attack, his Nuer warriors destroyed nine Sudanese Regiments on the Dinka side. In September 1927, Major Jasper William George Wyld, known in short as "Wyld" or "Tiger", Bor's District Commissioner, said that his interpreter, a mamur and a Dinka chief, reported that Guek was plotting rebellion and he was planning to kill Percy Coriat. In November 1927, H.C. Jackson, the man who had first contacted Guek in 1921, wrote from Halfa Province, where he was then governor, and pointed out that when reports of Guek's alleged rebellion poured into Malakal in 1921, the pieces of evidence against Guek were completely false when he personally visited Guek - Jackson suggested that the same procedure should be followed.

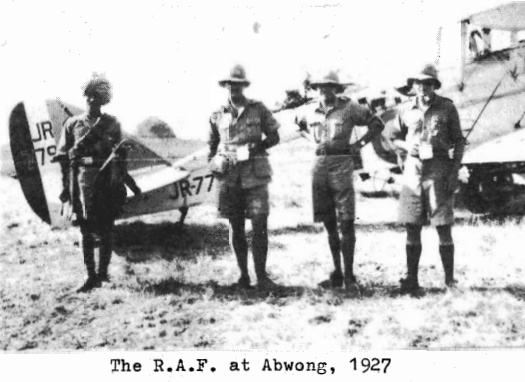
British Royal Air Force at Abwong in 1927

The relationship between Guek and the government deteriorated when a local court and a native police force were established, significantly limiting Guek's authority, and when the government suggested building a road through Nuerland to connect it to the region of their adversaries, the Dinka. Soon, hundreds of bulls were sacrificed at the Pyramid's base, and warriors from all over Nuerland arrived, including forces led by two additional prophets, Char Koryom and Puok Kerjiok. In 1927, the Western Nuer District Commissioner Captain V.H. Ferguson was supposedly slain, along with a Greek merchant, by a group of Nuer led by minor Western Nuer prophet Gatluak Nyang, resulting in an order to arrest Guek.

On November 29, 1928, Percy Coriat and C. Armine Willis, known as "Chunky" Willis, the army's commander-in-chief of the military forces in Anglo-Egyptian Sudan, dispatched four British Royal Air Forces carrying 20-pound bombs to destroy the Ngundeng Pyramid, which the government had already identified as a symbol of Nuer resistance. The 20-pound bombs carried by four bi-plane bombers missed the Pyramid, and the Nuer fled to their sorghum fields. Another bombing and machine gun run against the Pyramid and the Nuer occurred the other day. The Royal Air Force raids killed two old men and 200 cattle during these plane attacks.

A large number of government troops successfully dispersed the Nuer and reached the Pyramid a few days after the Royal Air Force raids. The failure to destroy the pyramid lowered the government's prestige. The Royal Engineers were summoned in to demolish it using explosives. The second attempt to destroy the pyramid failed, as Percy Coriat described it: "A puff of white smoke and a few lumps of earth tumbling down the side was all they saw." The pyramid's foundation remained intact, while just the top had been removed. Nevertheless, the Khartoum administration informed the public and the world at large that the pyramid had been "completely destroyed".

== Gallery ==
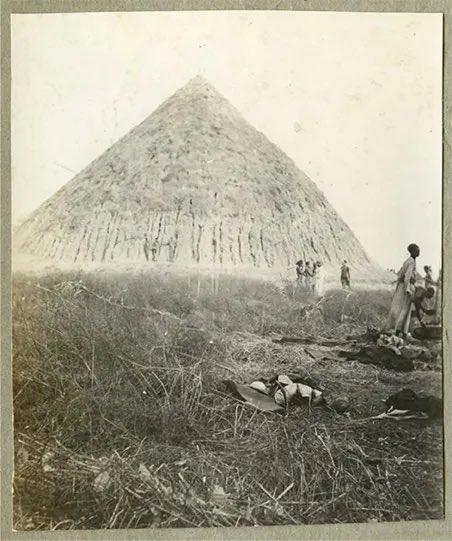
Ngundeng Pyramid.

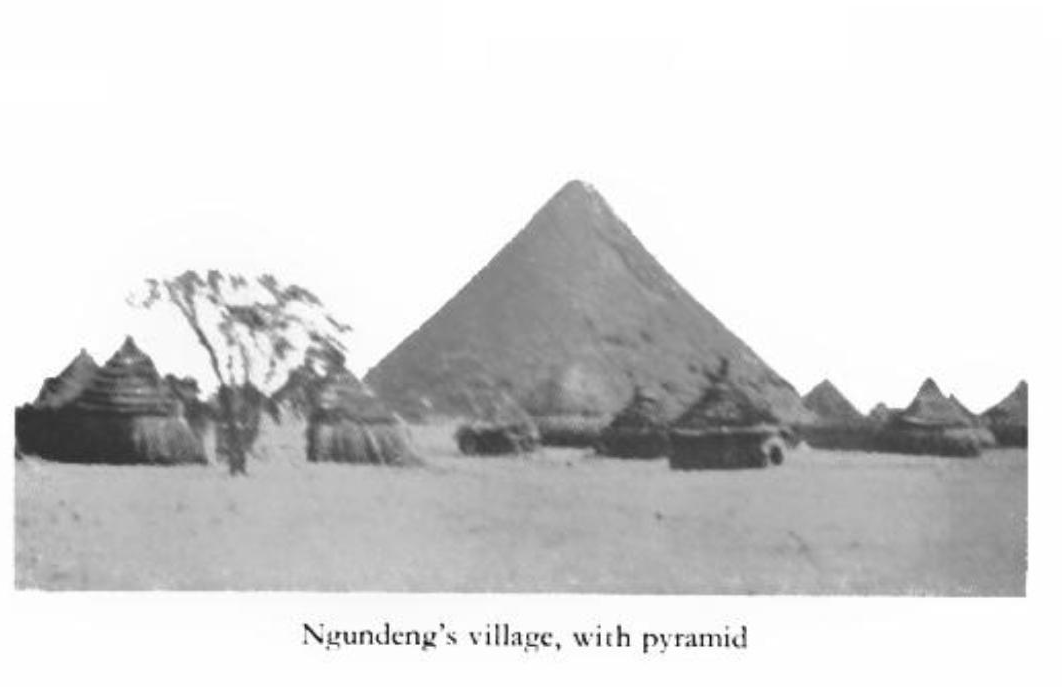
Wech Deng and the Pyramid.

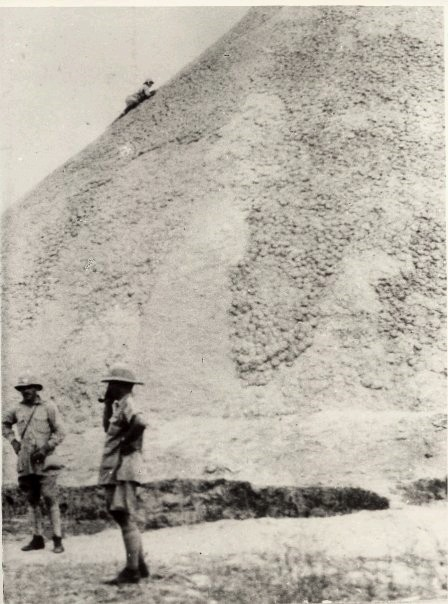
Percy Coriat climbing the Pyramid.

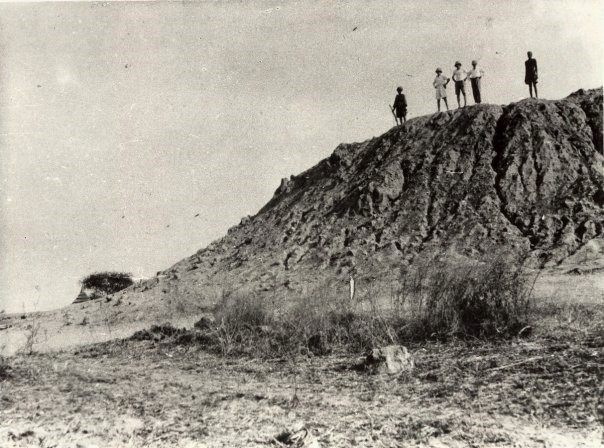
British Officers on top of the demolished Ngundeng Pyramid.

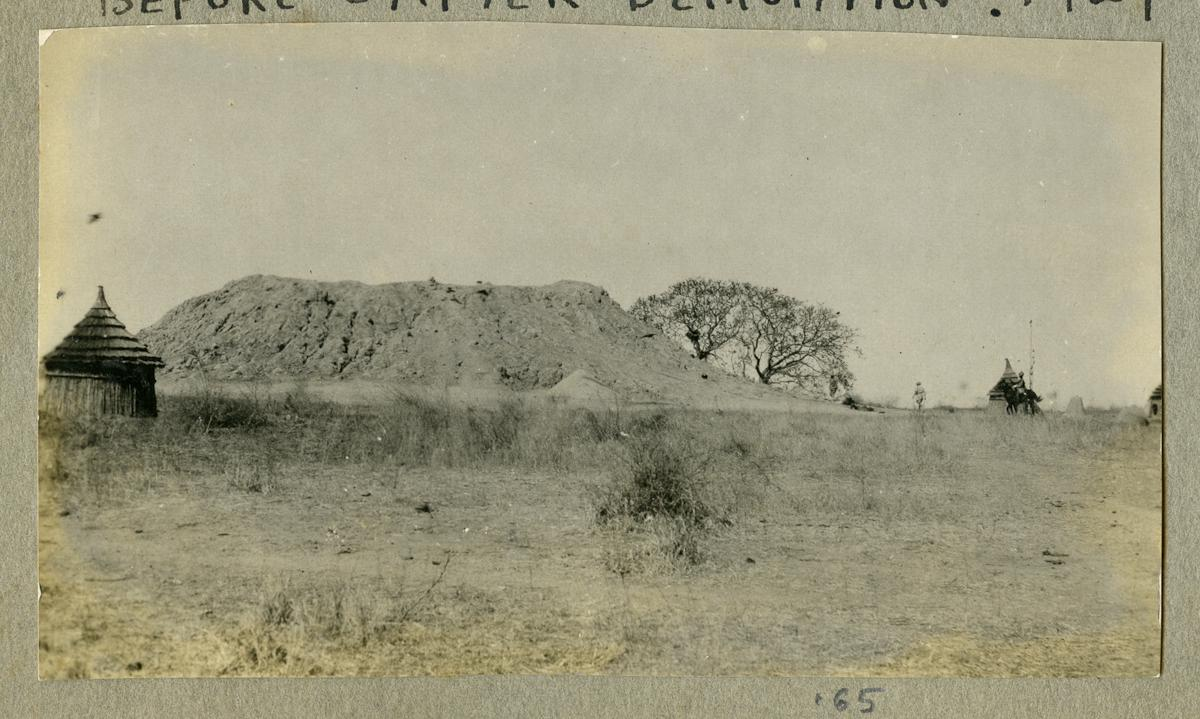
Ngundeng Pyramid after demolition.
