= 2009 Sobat River ambush =

Coordinates: 8.61627°N 33.056889°E

2009 Sobat River conflict
- Part of Sudanese nomadic conflicts
Date	12 June 2009
Location	near Nasir, South Sudan

Belligerents
Sudan People's Liberation Army	Jikany Nuer tribesmen

Strength
27 barges carrying food aid with a 150-man SPLA escort, four other barges	Unknown

Casualties and losses
- At least 40 soldiers and civilians killed
- 735 tonnes of food aid looted or destroyed, 11 UN barges missing

The attack took place near the town of Nasir, South Sudan, near the border with Ethiopia

The 2009 Sobat River ambush was a battle between Jikany Nuer tribesmen and the Sudanese People's Liberation Army (SPLA), which was escorting a United Nations (UN) aid convoy, on 12 June 2009.

== Inspection and exchange of gunfire ==
The UN convoy consisted of 27 barges travelling on the Sobat River from Nasir to Akobo, in Southern Sudan near the border with Ethiopia. Following rains which washed away roads, the river was the only way to move aid around the south of the country, which has suffered from tribal fighting – the river itself being closed earlier in the year due to increased tension in the area. The 27 UN barges were travelling in company with four other barges. The barges were only allowed to use the river following negotiations with high-ranking government officials, who agreed to a 150-man SPLA escort. The convoy was operating under the auspices of the UN World Food Programme (WFP) and was to have helped support around 18,000 of the 135,000 people displaced by recent tribal fighting which claimed hundreds of lives.

The convoy was stopped about ten or twenty miles downstream of Nasir by a force of Jikany Nuer tribesmen. The tribesmen demanded to search the barges to check that arms and ammunition were not being shipped to their rivals in the Lou Nuer tribe. They searched one barge, finding only food, but opened fire when the rest of the convoy tried to continue its journey. The attack killed at least 40 Sudanese soldiers and wounded 30 others. The deaths of several women and children by gunfire or drowning have also been reported. The wounded were taken to a Médecins Sans Frontières hospital in Nasir which was braced to accept further casualties. This was believed to be the first time the SPLA has suffered significant casualties in the recent tribal violence.

== Aftermath ==
While sixteen UN barges were able to return to Nasir, the other eleven remain unaccounted for, and are believed to have been sunk or looted. The WFP lost 735 tonnes of food aid in the attack and airlifted ten tonnes of aid to the area on 13 June. The attack may have been made to prevent the food supplies reaching the Lou Nuer tribe which is alleged to have killed around 70 members of the Jikany Nuer tribe in attacks in May 2009. It is feared that the Lou Nuer may be planning a retaliatory strike against the Jikany Nuer.

There is fear of renewed fighting in the area, following the recent end of the Second Sudanese Civil War and the upcoming 2010 national elections and 2011 referendum on independence for Southern Sudan.

Clashes between rival tribes and ethnic groupings are common in Southern Sudan and usually occur over cattle or access to natural resources. Fighting in May 2009 in South Kurdufan between the Rizeigat and Messiria tribes claimed more than 1,000 lives.
