= Pulchuol =

Pulchuol is one of the ten payams in Uror County, which is located in Jonglei State, South Sudan. It is located in the west of waat the Bieh State headquarters, Motot in the north east and Pieri in the east.
