= Deng Laka =

Nuer People's prophet

Deng Laka (died 1907) was a Gaawar Nuer people's prophet of the divinity DIU. He led the Nuer in the battle called Mut Roal (Raid on Arabs) against the Twic Dinka and their Arab allies in which the Nuer emerged victorious. He also led the force that overthrew Nuaar Mer in 1879, the merchant's ally among Gaawar.

Deng Laka brokered a peace deal that ended a feud between Radh and Bar, two of the primary sections of Gaawar Nuer.

== Personal life ==
Deng Laka was born to a Dinka refugee family living among the Gaawar Nuer along the Zeraf Valley in what is now part of Jonglei state, South Sudan, in the mid-nineteenth century. His mother and sisters were captured and sold into slavery by Nuaar Mer, a powerful man from the Radh clan of Gaawar, who was a contact point for the Arab merchants from the Ottoman Empire.

== Spiritual endeavors ==
During the same time when Ngundeng Bong became famous as a prophet possessed by Deng divinity among the Lou Nuer, Deng Laka proclaimed spiritual seizure by divinity Diu among Gawaar Nuer. He waged a war against Nuaar Mer after his allies, the Arab merchants of Turco-Egyptian Sudan withdrew from Bahr el-Zaref. He defeated and killed Nuaar Mer, and became the dominant leader of the Nuer around Zeraf valley.

Deng Laka then successfully led the Gaawar Nuer to the battle Mut Roal, and fought against the Twic Dinka and their Arab allies. In this battle, the Dinka and the Arabs failed to coordinate their movements and were defeated heavily in a single attack. Deng Laka himself is said to have personally killed the Arab commander.

According to sources from the time and British officials, the Mut Roal battle took place in 1885, during the Turco-Egyptian Sudan period.

Deng Laka waged intermittent warfare against the Dinka who had also backed the slavers, and when floods in the Bahr al-Zaraf forced him to seek higher ground on the Duk ridge. He fought with the Nyarreweng and Ghol Dinka to the south. He was usually successful in attacks against his southern Dinka neighbours, but he also drew Dinka young men as his followers.

Deng Laka maintained close ties with the Dinka shrine at Luang Deng and made various marriage arrangements with Dinka clans residing among the Gaawar. Many of these Dinka sympathizers accompanied his incursions into the south. As he grew older, peacekeeping and dispute resolution became more important to him, albeit he was never as successful as his rival, Ngundeng Bong.
