= Nasir County =

Nasir County KuanyLualThuan
- County
- Location in South Sudan
- Coordinates: +) 8°36′N 33°4′E
- Country: South Sudan
- Region: Greater Upper Nile
- State: Upper Nile State
- Headquarter: Nasir, South Sudan

Government
  - Commissioner: James Gatluak Lew Thiep

Area
  - Total: 2,003 sq mi (5,188 km^{2})

Population (2017 estimate)
  - Total: 302,034 +
  - Density: 150.8/sq mi (58.22/km^{2})
- Time zone: UTC+2 (CAT)

Nasir County also known as KuanyLualThuan is an administrative area of Upper Nile State in the Greater Upper Nile region of South Sudan. The headquarters is the town of Nasir, on the north side of the Sobat River, about 30 kilometres (19 mi) from the Ethiopian border.

== Economy ==
As in most other parts of South Sudan, Nasir County is extremely poor and lacks infrastructure. During decades of civil war, the countryside has been ravaged. Many people fled to refugee camps, and many failed to obtain education. Skilled labour is in short supply. The economy is based on subsistence agriculture, with unpredictable yields. The 2009 crop was poor due to lack of rain. In 2010 the problem was the reverse, with abnormally heavy rains flooding most of the county. Only the area within a 5 kilometres (3.1 mi) radius of Nasir was accessible by road.

== Health ==
In Nasir, primary health care services are provided in 15 health facilities. There are 3 Primary Health Care Centers (PHCCs) and 12 Primary Health Care Units (PHCUs). A PHCU is the lowest health facility, followed by a PHCC. In a PHCC, patients can be detained for monitoring (admitted) during treatment of the most severe condition and Basic Emergency Obstetric Care is provided for women in maternity. In a PHCU, basic outpatient care is provided to people who attend the clinic days, any severe condition is referred to a PHCC or a Hospital.

The health services in Nasir County are being provided by the government. However, due to the impacts of civil war which stressed the government allocation of development resources, some local NGOs could come in to support. The Universal Network for Knowledge & Empowerment (UNKEA) is a National Organization [NNGO] founded in the county. Despite corruption and ethnic-affiliated services which the organization was accused of for a long time, UNKEA is allowed to help in providing health services in Nasir Hospital and has activated the surgical capacity of the hospital. The delivery of health services in Nasir County is funded by UNICEF with funding from WORLD BANK, under the COVID-19 Emergency Response and Health Systems Preparedness Project [CERHSP]. CERHSP commenced in 2019 and is to continue till 2024. Previously in 2013 Nasir Hospital the health care services were provided by Médecins Sans Frontières (MSF) and partly funded by ECHO (European Commission). Administratively, the health service delivery is managed by the County Health Department [CHD], under the CHD Director.

== Security ==
In June 2009 armed civilians of the eastern Jikany section of the Nuer people attacked a barge convoy on the Sobat River guarded by Sudan People's Liberation Army (SPLA) soldiers. The 27 barges were carrying humanitarian aid supplied by the United Nations to Lou Nuer people in Akobo County where about 16,000 displaced people were in serious need of food. Four or five of the barges may have been sunk. The attack seems to have been due to suspicions that some of the barges carried weapons. The Jikany and Lou Nuer are traditional opponents who fought a war between 1993 and 2004. The same month about seventy-five people were killed in a cattle raid in the county, mainly children and women.
