= Pathai =

- Town
- Location within South Sudan
- Coordinates: 8°4′19″N 31°50′0″E
- Country: South Sudan
- Region: Greater Upper Nile
- State: Jonglei State
- County: Uror County
- Payam: Pathai

Pathai is a town in the Uror county in BiehState, in the Greater Upper Nile region of South Sudan approximately 358 kilometres (222 mi) away from Juba, the capital city of South Sudan.

Pathai has received may refugees escaping areas affected by the South Sudanese Civil War.
