= Peter Bol Koang =

South Sudanese politician

Peter Bol Koang has been the Governor of Eastern Bieh, South Sudan since 24 December 2015. He is the first governor of the state, which was created by President Salva Kiir on 2 October 2015.
