= Lankien, South Sudan =

Lankien
- boma village
- Location within South Sudan
- Coordinates: 8°31′31.9″N 32°03′41.5″E
- Country: South Sudan
- Region: Greater Upper Nile
- State: Jonglei State
- County: Nyirol County
- Payam: Thol Payam

Lankien is a boma in Thol Payam, Nyirol County, Jonglei State, South Sudan.

== History ==
In February 2026, homes and buildings in Lankien, including an 80-bed Médecins Sans Frontières (MSF) facility were bombed, burnt, and looted. The MSF stated it cannot conculsively establish who was responsible for the attack, although local reports indicate the South Sudan People's Defence Forces (SSPDF) were the perpetrators. Lankien residents largely fled and the MSF hospital permanently closed.

== Demographics ==
According to the Fifth Population and Housing Census of Sudan, conducted in April 2008, Lankien boma had a population of 5,138 people, composed of 2,926 male and 2,212 female residents. (Note: In 2008, at the time of the census, Lankien was located in Jonglei State, Nyirol County. The data collected during the Fifth Population and Housing Census of Sudan were to be the primary source of information for decisions about the number and demarcation of electoral constituencies and administrative boundaries in what was then southern Sudan. South Sudanese officials rejected census results for southern Sudan. See Darfur Relief and Documentation Centre (2010). 5th Population and Housing Census in Sudan – An Incomplete Exercise (PDF) (Report). Darfur Relief and Documentation Centre, Geneva (Switzerland). Archived from the original (PDF) on 18 September 2017. Also, see Demographics of South Sudan.)
