= Walgak, South Sudan =

Walgak
- Location within South Sudan
- Coordinates: 8.15933°N 32.239799°E
- Country: South Sudan
- Region: Greater Upper Nile
- State: Jonglei State
- County: Akobo County

Walgak is a town in the Akobo County of Jonglei State in the Greater Upper Nile region of South Sudan. It made headlines as the location of the February 2013 massacre of over 100 people in the ongoing Murle-Nuer conflict. The Walgak area is susceptible to severe flooding.
