= Motot =

- Town
- Location of Motot in South Sudan
- Coordinates: 8°9′53″N 32°3′12″E
- Country: South Sudan
- Region: Greater Upper Nile
- State: Jonglei State
- County: Uror County

Motot (also spelled Mwot Tot) is a town in the Uror County of Jonglei State, in the Greater Upper Nile region of South Sudan.

== History ==
Motot was one of the Lou Nuer villages in which the SPLA carried out a forcible disarmament campaign in 2006. The battle of Motot which occurred near Motot was the end of the campaign and ended the Nuer White Army for several years. UN peacekeepers were deployed in Motot after the conflict.

In August 2011, 200 people were injured and more than 300 were killed in Motot and the village of Pieri due to Murle attacks on the Lou Nuer.

During the South Sudanese Civil War, the United Nations World Food Program conducted food airdrops in May 2014 in Motot due to food shortages. In March 2017, humanitarians left Motot due to fighting in the area. On April 23, 2018, the SPLA-IO claimed government forces attacked its positions in Motot, although the government denied it was in the area. In June 2019 Motot experienced heavy flooding.
