= Nuer White Army =

Militant ethnic nationalist organization in South Sudan

- Flag
- Leader: Bordoang Leah
- Dates active: 1991–present
- Headquarters: Yuai, Uror County, South Sudan
- Active regions: South Sudan
- Ideology: Ethnic nationalism; Environmentalism; Indigenism
- Size: 25,000

The Nuer White Army, sometimes decapitalised as the "white army", is a semi-official name for an ethnic Nuer militant organization in central and eastern Greater Upper Nile in modern-day South Sudan formed around 1991. According to the Small Arms Survey, it arose from the 1991 schism within the Sudan People's Liberation Movement/Army (SPLM/A) for the dual purpose of defending Nuer cattle herds from neighbouring groups and fighting in the Second Sudanese Civil War between the SPLM/A and the Sudanese government.

While sometimes reported that the White Army was so named due to the Nuer practice of smearing one's skin with a light-coloured ash as a protection against biting insects, other sources contend the name was merely intended to draw a distinction between the Nuer militia and the Sudan Armed Forces, with the irregular "white" forces opposing the regular "black" forces. "Black forces" refer to a Nuer word, dec char, meaning a trained or uniformed soldier.

== History of activity ==
=== 1990s ===
During the Second Sudanese Civil War, White Army fighters mainly from the Lou Nuer subtribe backed the breakaway SPLM/A faction known as SPLA-Nasir, in attacks on the Dinka. They were partly responsible for the Bor massacre, in which at least 2000 people were killed in 1991. However, the fighters never formed long-term alliances with other factions in the war, acting for short-term benefit only. Among their most regular enemies were the Murle people, a rival tribe competing for land and cattle in the states of Jonglei and Upper Nile.

During the war, though the term "White Army" could refer collectively to Nuer youth militants, there was rarely any functioning central authority for the disparate fighters, and a number of White Army factions based around different cattle camps operated autonomously or semi-autonomously of one another. The ranks of leadership had a reportedly high rate of turnover.

=== 2000s ===
After the Comprehensive Peace Agreement of 2005 between the government of Sudan and the SPLM/A, which formed the Autonomous Government of Southern Sudan, the Nuer White Army lost its remaining coherence. By February 2006, Nuer elders interviewed by Small Arms Survey workers acknowledged they had little or no control over the armed youths and said the incidence of cattle theft and other miscreant behavior on the youths' part was increasing. Riek Machar, the White Army's erstwhile wartime ally, announced the White Army would be disbanded amidst an SPLM/A disarmament campaign in the region. However, it was not until a major defeat in May 2006 near Motot, in Jonglei's Uror County, in which 113 White Army fighters were reportedly killed for the loss of a single Sudan People's Liberation Army (SPLA) soldier, that the fighters gave up their attempts at resistance, according to the Small Arms Survey. The news service IRIN reported that more than 1,000 Lou Nuer men and boys in Akobo County who had been part of the White Army voluntarily surrendered their weapons to authorities in July 2006.

=== 2010s ===
In late December 2011, several months after South Sudan gained its independence, The Upper Nile Times reported that the Nuer White Army had re-formed and had issued a threat on Christmas Day 2011 to "wipe out the entire Murle tribe on the face of the earth as the only solution to guarantee long-term security of Nuer's cattle". The statement also declared the White Army's intention to fight the SPLA and the United Nations, which has a peacekeeping mission in the country. The declaration marked an escalation in the ongoing clashes between the SPLA, the Murle, and the Lou Nuer in Jonglei and Upper Nile, which began when armed Murle fighters under the influence of George Athor's South Sudan Democratic Movement launched a cattle raid against the Lou Nuer in Jonglei state. UNMISS responded by deploying peacekeepers to Pibor town and urging both the Murle and Lou Nuer to lay down their arms.

=== 2020s ===
Clashes broke out in the South Sudanese town of Nasir in Nasir County between members of the South Sudan People's Defence Forces (SSPDF) and the Nuer White Army on 3 March 2025, resulting in the capture of the town's army barracks by the White Army.

During an SSPDF evacuation attempt on 7 March, helicopters belonging to the United Nations Mission in South Sudan came under fire, resulting in significant casualties.
