= Ulang County =

Ulang
- County
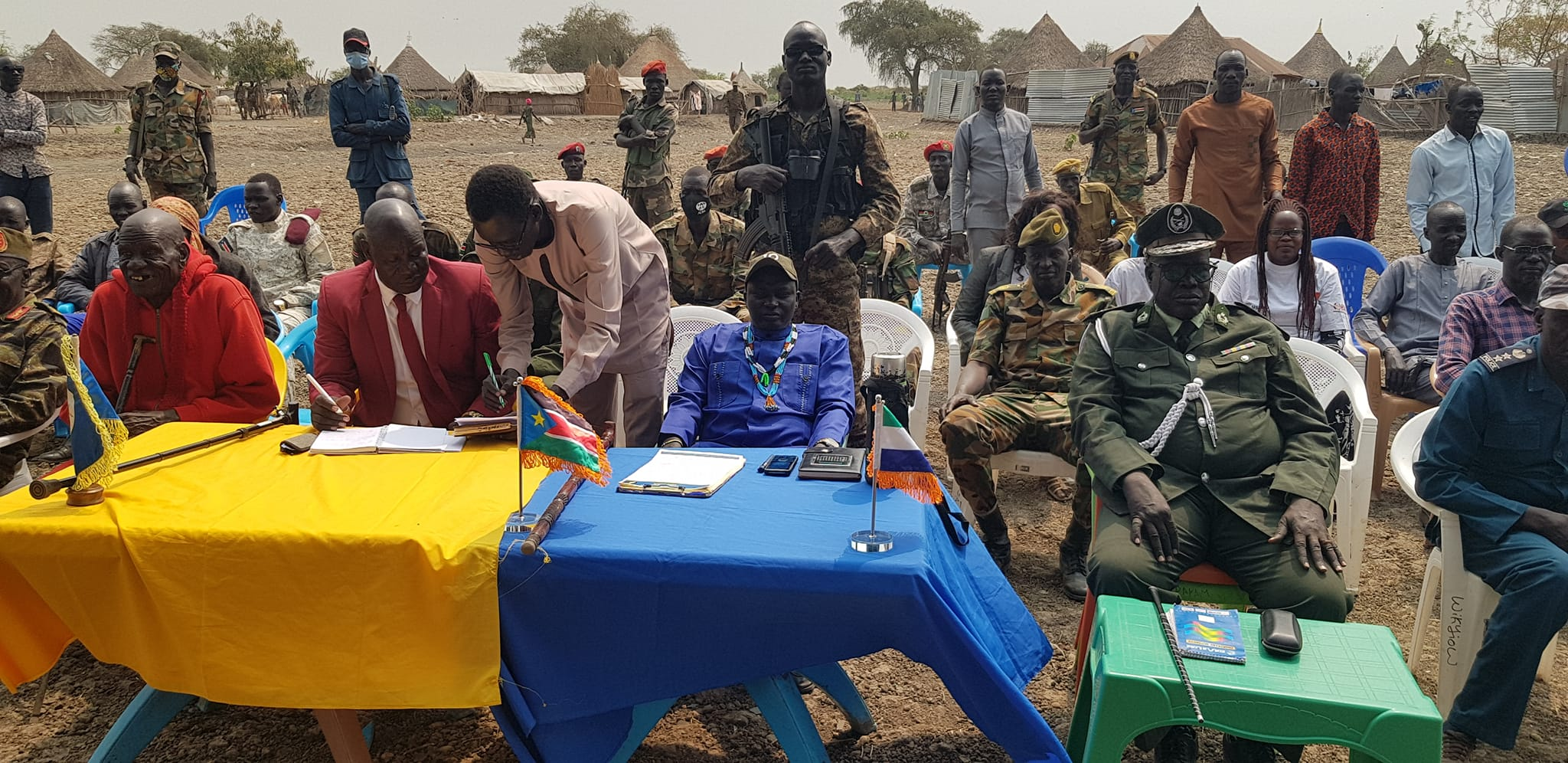
- Ulang County Commissioner Riek Gach signing Peace documents at the Jikmir Peace Conference
- Country: South Sudan
- Region: Greater Upper Nile
- State: Upper Nile State

Government
  - Commissioner: General Manpiny Pal Juach

Area
  - Total: 10,019 km^{2} (3,868 sq mi)

Population (2017 estimate)
  - Total: 198,123 +
  - Density: 19.775/km^{2} (51.216/sq mi)
- Time zone: UTC+2 (CAT)

Ulang is a county in Upper Nile State, in the Greater Upper Nile region of South Sudan. The county border Nasir to the North and Akobo to the south. As in most other parts of South Sudan, Ulang lacks infrastructure. During decades of civil war, the countryside has been ravaged. Many people fled to refugee camps, and many failed to obtain an education. Skilled labor is in short supply. The economy is based on subsistence agriculture, with unpredictable yields. Over the last two years, Ulang has gained relative stability due to the new county commissioner's initiative, which focuses on reconciling various Ulang communities through reconciliation conferences.

It's a lowland region with grassy plains, woodlands, and marshes that are highly prone to floods. Approximately half of the households rely on agriculture as their main source of income (FAO & WFP 2019), while others primarily engage in livestock rearing, fishing, and gathering. The main cultivated crops include maize, sorghum, pumpkin, cowpeas, sesame, tomatoes, okra, onion, eggplant, cabbage, leafy greens, and various garden vegetables. Wealthier households own cattle, goats, and sheep.
