= Ngundeng Bong =

Prophet of the Nuer people (1830–1890)

Ngundeng Bong (c. 1830–1890) was a prophet of the Nuer people of South Sudan believed to having been conceived by his mother Nyayiel Malual through spirit. He presented himself as being an earthly representative of Deng, the sky god of the Nuer religion. His prophecies of the breakup of Sudan are still a factor in the politics of modern South Sudan.

== Background ==
Born as Ngundeng meaning, "God given" due to his peculiar proceedings surrounding his birth. His mother, a terrific odd woman who conceived beyond the age of giving birth was from central Nuer of Nyirol County. Just like any other world historical women both in the bible and in real life. Nyayiel was whispered to have lived beyond the thinking of nature blessing one with children and the pain of enduring life without a child can barely be trace back from biblical stories of prominent women like Hanna, Elizabeth and Sarah.

Consequently, we can mull over this as a miraculous event that can merely be lather on how his mother spent her youth life and her old age in shames and mockery among friends and relatives of her hubby’s and likes. It’s something which today would bury medical checkup and different approach of modern science and technology. By that time there were no hospitals to praise the miracles of scientific knowledge. One dies with no child or some kind of miracle like the substitutes of what has happened to Nyayiel could only be the option.

Belonging to famous age-mate goes by the name Thut-wielang an extremely rather elderly age mate made up of 70 years and above. This is not only unbelievable but the reality we all must learn to accept and confronts.

At this age one can only lapse in fact the solitary of God given child can lives among mankind. And exactly that is what has happened. Ngundeng was born rather in an odd neighborhood of eastern Jikany Nuer where his father came from a sub-section of eastern Jikany Nuer of Ciecany massively today occupies the Gambella region of Ethiopia.

Bong Chan the direct descendent of Keir Kaak Keer, the father of today’s Nuer of Eastern Jikany of Latjoor married Nyayiel when she was only 10 years using the Nuer traditional norms of waiting young girls and put something in the hands until they gradually grow to that stage of womanhood. He had no idea the historical fate of his choice. He was a man of illustrious moral fiber like that of Abraham.

Bong Chan and Nyayiel Malual spent rest of their lives in legendary hopes of one day shall have the joy of their youth. God didn’t let them down indeed. And famous Ngundeng was born in their old ages turning the course of history in Nuerland for the next centuries and so into something else. Their exodus to Luoland was backed with interpretation of divine possession of Ngundeng by something people term as some kind of lunacy or stipends else he doesn’t and her mother fit to abundance in Gajaak Kier land of Eastern Jikany Nuer.

== Legacy ==
Many believed he died early in 1906, a claim made by historian Douglas H. Johnson, who returned the Dang or prophet’s Rod to southern Sudan in May 2009.

Bieh or Pyramid: Prophet Ngundeng for the next 50 years or so before the human civilization marked it right hole of 20th century. He assembled the elders of Cush, black south Sudanese in old Sudan for what he brand as a grand formation of "Bieh" for the next generations to see in a village called Wec Deng.

The purpose of Bieh was not clear until the coming of historical Anthropologist Dr. Evan. E. Pritchard who took the pictures in 1923 and later he returned to England. The issues attracted the interest of Douglas H. Johnson enduring him to spend the rest of his adulthood learning about Nuer culture in Lou-Nuer land. Douglas is the biggest critics of prophet Ngundeng denying his prophecies and his magical power distorting their meaning with his advanced historical knowledge about black Africa.

Well, it’s hard to interpret Ngundeng songs and their implication about the future but not the like of Professor Douglas who decided to seek Nuer scholars’ helps to misinterpret these prophecies, seriously sound satirical.

While we largely respect and appreciate him for writing about Prophet Ngundeng, we can’t forget the other side of the story. The testimonies of our elders whose by that time Douglas didn’t reach into their villages and openly ignored them due to their illiteracy.

The stories of Ngundeng affect the entire Nuerland, Sudan as whole and the neighboring countries like Egypt and Ethiopia without forgetting Uganda and Kenya going to Somalia. The meaning of his legacy went up to England and living there for half a century until it was returned back.

=== Dang ===
Commonly known as prophet’s Rod, is the substantial evidences of Ngundeng and his atheist friends who officially claims that Ngundeng was mythological and a tale only befitting children to hear when going to bed. The official commemoration of Dang in Juba was known across the world not only to south Sudan but to palace of queen of England and the internet spread the news like a tsunamis quickly swallowing up half part of America while Japanese are deeply a sleep.

=== Drums and Tonye ===
They were taken to Egypt and the fairy-tale goes that, they beats themselves at night until the authority in Alexandria decided to returned them to Khartoum.. Dr. Douglas stated that, they were returned to Lou-Nuer land in 1978 from Khartoum.

=== GUEK NGUNDENG ===
It’s an amazing thing to notice that, Ngundeng like any other person ever lived on earth had a family and children. This is something real that we need to take into consideration. During my stays in UNMISS IDPs site in Tongping located near International Airport in Juba, from Dec 19 to 19 April, I talks to his grand great children and some of his extended family members. Though they look more mystified about this man they just heard about like any other person reading this. There was sense of surprise and pride in them about the legendary living in their linage.

Guek who died early in 1927 in the battle of Lou Nuer and British is another crucial fact to convince every sophisticated man dismissing the existence of prophet Ngundeng. From that very day, the prophet’s Rod was taken and lived in England for the next half of a century.

Though prophet Ngundeng survived the great historical episode of foray of Africa countries by European and Arabs of Middle East, he set up a path we are all today following.

The long lasting exploration for total freedom against foreign offensive and their interest in this land is highly welcome meeting the sudden resistance from where he raised his banner of resistance and fought them off only on self-defense.

He fought Turkish, England, Italy and Anglo-Egypt. That was from 1820-1903. Total resistance against foreign incursion has been our vision of self-determination.

=== TUNG KERNYANG ===
It was around sun set in the month of January of 1896 when men in disgust approached the historic village of Wecdeng hauling one man in meticulous whose servants around him seems wearied uncertainties beyond their mission. With mighty army stroll owed with Ethiopian traditional weapons and much stronger made from sacrosanct blacksmith from Amahara land on approach.

They vowed a distance before they finally crises crossed into the land of one man whose fame not only spread through the thick highlands of Ethiopia but goes beyond the advisories ears in the palace of King of kings, King Menelik II the descendent of King Solomon via beautiful Queen Sheba whose family ruled Ethiopia for period of more than 2, 000 years.

The name "Buony" took effect from that very day due to nature of king Menelik II vowing before the mighty assumed magician, prophet Ngundeng who promised them victories against their adversaries, the mighty Italy. Superciliously none speak Amharic by that time, Ngundeng Bong Chan friendly chatted with the peculiar neighbor who present their only problem as that of foreigner’s invasion something Ngundeng shared with them in common.

Taking into account battles He Ngundeng fought previously in self defense against England. That very evening both Ethiopia and Nuer shared one universal attachment of social relation that can never be stair away despite the bundles of odd between them. They spent several weeks before they finally walked away with one precious gift from Wecdeng. The famous Bull called Tung Kernyang.

As they made their famous march back to Ethiopia with few servants among them from Somali land, it appeared that, one servant in particular stolen prophet’s "Toich" groundnuts which they were offered to them as welcome popcorn to celebrate their coming. The story goes Ngundeng cursed them turning their teeth stained brown. It’s not about shewing khat or flourishing water full from the ground, then why if so it affects only the incisor?

In that summer of February, Tung Kernyang was offered to King of Ethiopia, Menelik II as sacrificial lamp to fight off invaders. As they walked away in gratitude, the man on chair looked around sung his first miracles song that bonded the two nations forever. And there in purity he ordered his friends on court of universal spectacular to go and cut at least the tail that today defined the stays of massive south Sudanese in Ethiopia during their struggle and after struggle.

There on process, Ethiopia becomes the hubs course of African people waging unbeatable war against mighty world superpower in battles with riffles against sticks and pangs of Ethiopians. They won it leveling them on the current modern nations as a mass that wench them out of yoke of colonization.

With new spirit from Ngundeng blessing of Tung Kernyang. The combined forces of Africans slaves and Italy ran for their dear lives and on that fateful afternoon in the valley of Adwa on March 1896, king Menelik II became a man of distinction among his African friends and cross the globe.

It’s a legacy we all need to reflect on. The courtesy of Ngundeng Bong

=== His Prophecies ===
Ngundeng prophecies are hard to term but easy to understand if seriously mindful of their deep meaning and their implication about the future. One of the most historical ignorance of 21st century is the person of Ngundeng and his prophecies. The worse is how south Sudanese twist them and turn away from them. They only vowed and reverend the Pops of Rome and believed men like Dr. Douglas H. Johnson when they say Ngundeng was a mad man who claims nonsense. They all say yes, but I say no he was a historical prophet.

=== The return of Dang Predicted ===
"Mi cia thuɔ̱k kɛ ruac nööŋɛ daŋ, ɣän mac thuɔ̱k ɛni nyuurä" loosely translate;

If you have finish with the talks (debate) bring my (Rod); I, the language grabber still seated.

The coming of King Menelik II in Wecdeng need to be trace with accurate translations of what Ngundeng is talking about. If we may not say Ngundeng don’t understand the language of different races and ethics, Ngundeng would either have been a mad man or something else of what people claims about him.

Indeed after the so called intellectuals’ debates about the Dang, finally Dr. Douglas H. Johnson returned the Dang back home in May 2009. Here is the testimony of Dr. Douglas H. Johnson according to Martin Flaunt publication article of 06/03/2013 titled south Sudan: Riek Machar and prophet’s Rod.

"It happened that mine was covered in "fragile" stickers and bound by a large pink luggage strap but no one in Oxford station Paddington, or Heathrow raised an eyebrow or asked to see what was inside". Dang was inside that large pink luggage

That was the Dang passing through one of the most security tied on earth. Yet no single person in the entire station raised an alarm. Could this be coincidence that Deng was talking to these stations? Yet the story didn’t end there.

"Nor for that matter did anyone raise an alarm as I walked past customs in Jomo Kenyatta airport or when checking the boot of the taxi when we got to the Fairview Hotel (opposite the Israeli Embassy ), or checking the beg onto the flight to Juba. Either the disguise was entirely effective or security worldwide is lax"

And my friends here are seriously suggesting this was a coincidence or some kind of madness happening. Then let me send you away with one more last testimony from the historian.

"It was only later, after we had drives away that I realized that I was now in the Sudan quite illegally, as no one had examined and stamped my passport and travel permit, not to mention cleared my bags through customs. (I mentioned this to Riek later, and he laughed and said, "We will take care of it).

For those who attended the reception of Dang like Mary Boyo, it was in a material looking more of sniper bag. I wonder what silent the suspicious across the world that day, seriously a sniper bag?

Ngundeng not only talks about nature but the predicament that south Sudanese was to experience in the next generations. He concentrated more about war and peace.

=== His Prophecies About War ===
"Afterward Mary told Deng Nhail Chiok later that she had a dream that a man was fighting the whole of southern Sudan, and that man is Riek. She started running but then a voice told her that those at the reception for the Dang were blessed". This is purely Dr. Douglas testimonies about the dang.

"Bä ro̱l buɔ̱p kä ba̱ tar cet kɛ mi cɛ bi ränh, bi thuk dial ŋot ni kɛ diw" loosely translates

I will turn the nation upside down facing upside down; like if it not going to approach; all mouths will continues speaking doubts.

The fact that Ngundeng sung them in songs he was a real historian and self seeking attention man who know that, he lives among the most uneducated people in south Sudan. So it wasn’t hard to calculate that, songs will be remembered for the next generations just like today. He was smart prophet.

In another occasion like a bush fire spreading across the shrubs of shalom in the valleys of Jordon, Ngundeng mentioned the current uprising of mighty White army and how the current Revolutionaries Leader Dr. Machar will be in certain kind of dilemma to control them in the second phase of liberation in the history of south Sudanese. That alone doesn’t fit the combined claims of Dr. Riek Machar being the chosen one. Rethink again.

But to some extent if prophecies will be in deliberation, it will shield how we interprets each verses in Ngundeng songs not as claims by Dr. Douglas H. Johnson as "many of the current prophecies being appointed to Riek are recent inventions". I also dismiss the grooming of Riek in whatever thing Ngundeng didn’t talks about.

"Ci kɔ̱a̱k Kerä dä ɣööŋ, ci Tɛny ku giëër kɛnɛ dayiöm. Bä ji guɔ̱ri jɔl kɛ thol luak, bä kɛ näk ni kɛ näk Diu"

My Keer (cows) graves are widely open; Teny and disciples are stranded. I will first kill the military officers; I will kill them like the killing of Diu.

The notion of Keer or cow here mean a lot during Ngundeng time on plot to used imagery. They always says in Nuer, "Raan ɛ yaŋ Kuɔth" meaning human is God’s cow. So don’t worries going to the battle God of land will give you protection? This makes sense I guess. The stranding of Teny which he means Machar here is another food for thoughts too. Loosely trying to bring the loose coalition of white army and the current confectionist defected Spla soldiers is something I don’t want to proclaim alone.

His cows which are dying like flies is nothing but the unburied Nuer who were massacred in Juba and other south Sudanese not buried in this war. Their graves are widely open in most of the battles fought since December.

In UNMISS I chanted with an old man and when I asked him about the issues of ghosts town of Malakal why it keep exchanging hands between white army and government troops. He looked at me and cites the Ngundeng prophecies by singing them in songs. Very loudly until the whole issues made fame. One particular verse which I recorded attracted my attention.

"Riak Makal ban todt raar a bi mani jom" translated as such, town of Malakal we shall spend the autumn outside even Winter. We have a long way to go about Malakal.

=== Coming Of Foreign Troops Predicted. ===
Some of the prophecies of Ngundeng I wouldn’t dare go there due to their serious negative implication about the current crisis. He was a warrior. Prophet Ngundeng went too far to talks about the coming of foreigner’s troops in south Sudan.

"Kua̱r da̱ŋ ŋuan ŋot ni jɔ̱ɔ̱r, ja̱lkɛ jur ti kur kä bathdɔɔri. bi waŋ cuecdä a cäŋ kɛnɛ pay""

Four leaders are yet to come with hundreds and thousands of strangers (force). my right eyes will be sun and moon"

Here he exclusively talks about their defeat. The coming of Uganda and president’s mercenaries if it’s something to consider let closed the case of the four leaders. Perhaps he mean the extra president Kiir’s making the Egypt and Ethiopia, Uganda and Sudan to go into blames game of words over south Sudan issues until the whole thing public-ally take effect and turn onto regional war. Nobody is certain yet.

Then one asks, what Ngundeng means about "…..my right eyes will be sun and moon" this is why I can says Ngundeng prophecies are hard to term and translates. The elder I met didn’t explain this to me because I didn’t bother asking. I was very excited putting Egypt into the long list of still to come other three leaders to fight single hand tribe White Army and still will be defeated. Such a pride

In another occasion the prophet uttered these expensive but daring words of prophecies about south Sudan crisis. He talks about Nubian and Darfurians terming them as they will lose their marriage between him because they involve themselves into his family affair. Its heart breaking that, the rebels of Sudanese mingle themselves into south Sudan crisis leaving their Justice and Equality Movement. After this war, I doubt Darfur and Nubians will have what they called struggle. Their marriage between Ngundeng is coming to an end. Sad!!!!

Don’t forget it’s the same man who prophesied about the ten south Sudanese states. He talked about,

"ca beera da mat kena ber roal" my flag cannot be combined with that of (roal) Arabs. Dr. John Garang was just fighting something bigger than him. It was unfortunate.

Prophet Ngundeng according to stories from our elders talks about the death of John Garang de Mabior in hills far away under different influence. The conspiracy death of Dr. John Garang will still be debated. He centers his message about a bearded man he term as, "Tikyual kuoth" who will lead his people but his fire going to blast. Here we go.

"Tikyual kouth da bi mac da bool" like a jokes, "my God bearded man fire will blazed". He continues to cautioned that,

"laatde je ciet ka mi ca bi ranth; cango wa mar ro we mar ni thaar Bieh ka a ba wa toom" loosely translates, "talks about it as if it will not come; when it explodes under Bieh it will have a very loud sound. Let people talks about it as if it will not come to pass; the very day it will explode around Bieh it will have a very huge sound" it was some king of warning I guess.

When Ngundeng built the pyramid it was an art center for gathering his disciples and south Sudanese. It represents some kind of town or Headquarter. Could what has happened in Juba mean what Ngundeng was talking about? Is hard to tenure but it’s another way to quench thirst.

WHY NUER IN UNMISS?

It has never happen in history of Sudan that, Nuer can be IDPs in their own country. But it does. History made it happened. It was;

"kuel turuk" "gates of civilization" guarding my children. Notice the words children referred to all south Sudanese.

NGUNDENG AND DR. RIEK MACHAR TENY DHURGON

It’s important to noticed that, the implication of bearded man will grabs power and a left-handed man will raise the flag was meant to dismiss the current prophecies invented on Riek Machar.

There was never Riek to raise the flag but it was true Ngundeng talks about a left hand man with gaped teeth who will lead his flocks into prosperities and peace. If one decided to say it is Dr. Riek Machar then think again while we examines the facts about who Ngundeng was referring too.

I believe president Kiir failed on that peace and prosperity considering his poor ill performances since independent. One man mistake we cannot brand it on everyone. Historical is an insult to human civilization and modern concurrences and religious edifice and beliefs. Kiir has failed south Sudanese.

"Riek da ba totd raar ka Jiom ba ruac da riet". Short but powerful statement, hundreds year before the so called Riek was born. A prophecy was perceived about a man who will lead his people into prosperity and peace but warned after the "Mac of tikyual kuoth" blazed he will take over the nation. Let’s not misinterprets the prophecies. Nobody is saying here that Riek is taking power after Kiir.

Translates as, my Riek will be out during autumn but in Winter I will have a words about him.

Some little kind of calculation here and there will finally do well over this controversy about Riek being out during autumn and winter. When was the former powerful vice president of south Sudan sacked? Midst of July 23 2013. That was winter right?

Talking about the two important seasons of the year prophet Ngundeng uttered, then one wonder why it seem so truth. Dr. Riek Machar out of plots to trolled him out of power by Kiir government with one particular reason, that of, to weaken his move for the next general election. President Kiir on midst 23 July evening surprisingly sacked his deputy and the news blasted the media. That was winter one month to the month of autumn.

Indeed out of nowhere, Dr. Machar spent the whole of "Totd" autumn outside the government as an ordinary man like any other. Then what has happened in "Jiom" winter the same year? Riek voyaged Juba for safety to Jonglie. It wasn’t a coincidence. It was midst of Dec/15/2013 when the worst, that shattered the whole nation, became active.

In normal sense like a primary kid surprisingly noticed her father during visiting day, the month of autumn kicked off every year from September throughout of November to second week of December. In the middle of December around 15 there, the winter begins where people start preparing for the Christmas. Ask geotropically scholars. They can edifice us on this.

So, when prophet Ngundeng cited his "Riek" being out during "Totd" autumn and when winter come "Jiom" he will say something about him. We can here testify this fact that indeed Riek if we can formulate this prophecy on him as the man prophet Ngundeng talks about then prophet Ngundeng wasn’t just a mythical, legend or historian but a historical prophet having a big hand in current crisis in south Sudan.

However, Ngundeng did not say he is a God to be worship but ask his believers to worship the only creator of all living and non-living. as he stated in his song saying, "Palɛ dɛŋ kä dɔ̱ŋ bia tëë gua̱th mi tɔt" meaning, worship God to give you some space.
