= Nasir, South Sudan =

City in South Sudan

Nasir
- City
- Location in South Sudan
- Coordinates: 8°36′N 33°4′E
- Country: South Sudan
- Region: Greater Upper Nile
- State: Upper Nile State
- County: Nasir County

Population (2026 estimate)
  - Total: 10,000
- Time zone: UTC+2 (Central Africa Time)

Nasir (Arabic: الناصر, romanized: an-Nāṣir) is a city in the Nasir County of Upper Nile State, in the Greater Upper Nile region of South Sudan. The city is on the north side of the Sobat River, about 30 kilometres (19 mi) from the Ethiopian border. It is the administrative center of Nasir County.

== History ==
=== Early days ===
Charles W. Gwynn passed through this town while he was reconnoitering the Ethiopia–Sudan border in March 1900. There he found "a young Egyptian officer in charge of a small Government post, but he apparently had had no communications with anyone since the river Sobat had fallen, and was anxiously awaiting its rise in hopes of a steamer to replenish his stores."

The local airstrip is reputed to have been built by the RAF in the 1930s as a point en route from Khartoum to Nairobi. It was used as a fuel stop for RAF aircraft operations in North and East Africa.

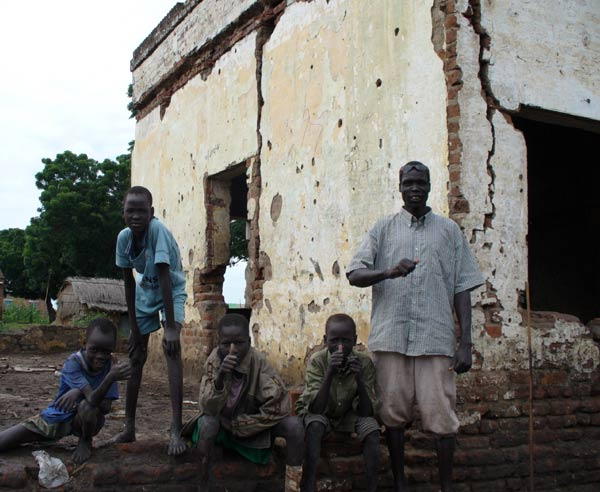
Man and children outside building in Nasir.

=== Civil war ===
SPLA-Nasir, a splinter faction of the Sudan People's Liberation Army active from 1991 to 1994, derived their name from the town because it was their base.

In 1991 local rebel leader Riek Machar used Nasir as his base of operations. There he met Emma McCune, a British aid worker who he later married. She died in Nairobi in November 1993 in a traffic accident. In May 1991 large numbers of refugees fleeing the civil war in Ethiopia descended on Nasir, swelling the local population from a few hundred to tens of thousands.

UN Operation Lifeline Sudan subsequently used Nasir as a major distribution point for WFP food distributions and UNICEF operations. These included rinderpest vaccinations of the local cattle population, meningitis vaccination programs, seed and tool inputs as well as emergency feeding programs.

On 12 February 1998, a Sudanese Air Force Antonov An-32 crashed in Nasir Airport, killing various senior government leaders, including Vice-President Zubair Mohamed Salih.

=== Post Independence ===
In the aftermath of the South Sudanese Civil War, Nasir was the site of several clashes between the South Sudan People's Defence Forces and the Nuer White Army, including the 2025 Nasir clashes.

On 17 March 2026, Nasir was designated as the temporary capital of Upper Nile State, with state government institutions moving from Malakal to assuage fears of instability in the area caused by the 2025 clashes and Operation Enduring Peace. The government estimated the city's population at 10,000 people at the time of the temporary state capital designation.
