= Uror County =

Uror Yuai
- County
- Country: South Sudan
- Region: Greater Upper Nile
- State: Jonglei State
- Headquarters: Uror

Government
  - commissioner: Gatluak Reath, Tut Puk, Simon Hoth Duol, Tang Chatim and Machot Gatluak (SPLM IO)

Area
  - Land: 12,163 km^{2} (4,696 sq mi)
- Elevation: 410 m (1,350 ft)

Population (2017 estimate)
  - Total: 245,386
  - Density: 20.175/km^{2} (52.252/sq mi)
- Time zone: UTC+2 (CAT)

Uror County is a county of Jonglei state in the Greater Upper Nile region of South Sudan. It has nine payams: Pathai, Pieri, Pulchuol, Palouny, Motdit, Motot, Karam, Pajut, Weykol and Padiek.
