= Nuer people =

Nilotic ethnic group from South Sudan

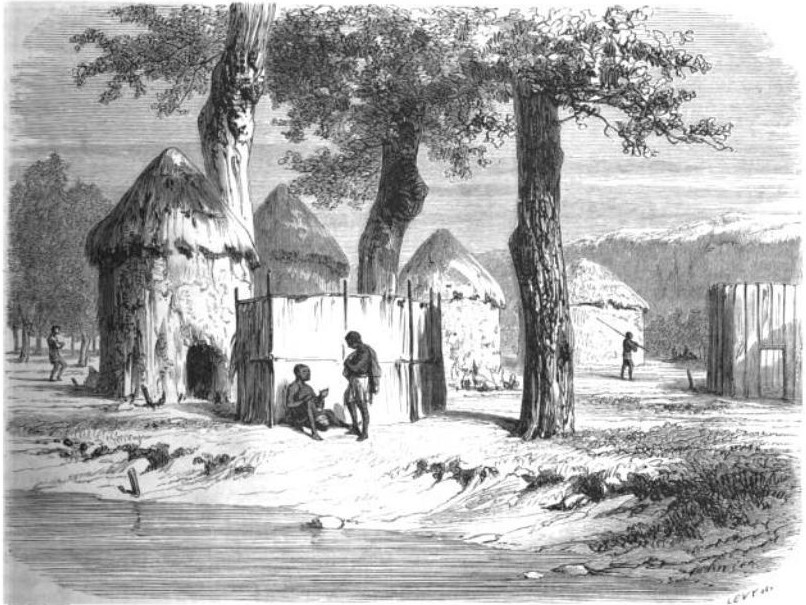
- 1862 illustration of a Nuer village

Total population
- 2 million

Regions with significant populations
- Nuerland
- South Sudan: 1.8 million
- Ethiopia: 147,672 (2007)

Languages
- Nuer (Thok Naath)

Religion
- Christianity (syncretistic or otherwise), Nuer religion

Related ethnic groups
- Dinka and Atwot

The Nuer people are a Nilotic ethnic group concentrated in the Greater Upper Nile region of South Sudan. They also live in the Ethiopian region of Gambella. The Nuer speak the Nuer language, which belongs to the Nilotic language family. They are the second-largest ethnic group in South Sudan and the largest ethnic group in Gambella, Ethiopia. The Nuer people are pastoralists who herd cattle for a living. Their cattle serve as companions and define their lifestyle. The Nuer call themselves "Naath".

== Overview ==
In South Sudan, the Nuer are primarily located in the northeast of the country

Historically, as semi-nomads, the Nuer may have been undercounted. They also have a culture of counting only older members of the family. For example, the Nuer believe that counting the number of cattle one has could result in misfortune and prefer to report fewer children than they have. Their South Sudan counterparts are the Horn peninsula's westernmost Horners.

== History ==
The Nuer people are said to have originally been a section of the Dinka people that migrated out of the Gezira south into a barren, dry land that they called "Kwer Kwong", which was in southern Kordofan. Centuries of isolation and influence from the Luo peoples caused them to be a distinct ethnic group from the Naath. The arrival of the Baggara and their subsequent slave raids in the late 1700s caused the Nuer to migrate from southern Kordofan into what is now Bentiu. In around 1850, further slave raids as well as flooding and overpopulation caused them to migrate even further out of Bentiu and eastwards all the way into the western fringes of Ethiopia, displacing and absorbing many Dinka, Anyuak and Burun in the process.

British colonial expansion in the region during the 19th century greatly halted the Nuers' aggressive territorial expansion against the Dinka and Anyuak.

There are different accounts of the origin of the conflict between the Nuer and the Dinka, South Sudan's two largest ethnic groups. Anthropologist Peter J. Newcomer suggests that the Nuer and Dinka are actually similar. He argues that hundreds of years of population growth created expansion, which eventually led to raids and wars.

In 2006 the Nuer and Murle were the tribes that resisted disarmament most strongly; members of the Nuer White Army, a group of armed youths often autonomous from tribal elders' authority, refused to lay down their weapons, which led SPLA soldiers to confiscate Nuer cattle, destroying their economy. The White Army was finally put down in mid-2006, though a successor organization self-styling itself as a White Army formed in 2011 to fight the Murle tribe (see 2011–2012 South Sudan tribal clashes), as well as the Dinka and UNMISS.

== Culture ==
Cattle have historically been of the highest symbolic, religious and economic value to the Nuer. Sharon Hutchinson writes that "among Nuer people the difference between people and cattle was continually underplayed." Cattle are particularly important in their role as bride wealth, where they are given by a husband's lineage to his wife's lineage. This exchange of cattle ensures that the children will be considered to belong to the husband's lineage. The classical Nuer institution of ghost marriage, in which a man can "father" children after his death, is based on this definition of relations of kinship and descent by cattle exchange. In their turn, cattle given over to the wife's patrilineage enable the male children of that patrilineage to marry and thereby ensure the continuity of her patrilineage. An infertile woman can even take a wife of her own, whose children, biologically fathered by men from other unions, then become members of her patrilineage, and she is legally and culturally their father, allowing her to metaphorically participate in reproduction.

=== Cattle ===
Nuer life revolves around cattle, which has made them pastoralist, but they are known to sometimes resort to horticulture as well, especially when their cattle are threatened by disease. Due to seasonal harsh weather, the Nuer move around to ensure that their livelihood is safe. They tend to travel when heavy seasons of rainfall come to protect the cattle from hoof disease, and when resources for the cattle are scarce. British anthropologist E. E. Evans-Pritchard wrote, "They depend on the herds for their very existence...Cattle are the thread that runs through Nuer institutions, language, rites of passage, politics, economy, and allegiances."

The Nuer are able to structure their entire culture around cattle and still have what they need. Before development, the Nuer used every single piece of cattle to their advantage. According to Evans-Pritchard, cattle helped evolve the Nuer culture into what it is today. They shaped the Nuer's daily duties as they dedicated themselves to protecting the cattle. For example, each month they blow air into their cattle's rectums to relieve or prevent constipation. Cattle are no good to the Nuer if constipated because they are restricted from producing primary resources that families need to survive. Evans-Pritchard wrote, "The importance of cattle in Nuer life and thought is further exemplified in personal names." They form their children's names from the biological features of the cattle.

Evans-Pritchard wrote, "I have already indicated that this obsession—for such it seems to an outsider is due not only to the great economic value of cattle but also to the fact that they are links in numerous social relationships." All their raw materials come from cattle, including drums, rugs, clothing, spears, shields, containers, and leather goods. Even daily essentials like toothpaste and mouthwash are created from the cattle's dung and urine. The dung is chopped into pieces and left out to harden, then used for containers, toothpaste, or even to protect the cattle themselves by burning it to produce more smoke, keeping insects away to prevent disease.

The Nuer people never eat cattle just because they want to. Cattle are very sacred to them, therefore when they do eat cattle they honor its ghost. They typically just eat the cattle that are up in age or dying because of sickness. But even if they do so, they all gather together to perform rituals, dances, or songs before and after they slaughter the cattle. Never do they just kill cattle for the fun of it. "Never do Nuer slaughter animals solely because of the desire to eat meat. There is the danger of the ox’s spirit visiting a curse on any individual who would slaughter it without ritual intent, aiming only to use it for food. Any animal that dies of natural causes is eaten". Many times it may not even just be cattle that they consume, it could be any animal they have scavenged upon that has died because of natural causes. There are a few other food sources that are available for the Nuer to consume. The Nuer diet primarily consists of fish and millet. "Their staple crop is millet." Millet is formally consumed as porridge or beer. The Nuer turn to this staple product in seasons of rainfall when they move their cattle up to the higher ground. They might also turn to millet when the cattle are performing well enough to support their family.

In the 1990s, Sharon Hutchinson returned to Nuerland to update Evans-Pritchard's account. She found that the Nuer had placed strict limits on the convertibility of money and cattle in order to preserve the special status of cattle as objects of bride wealth exchange and as mediators to the divine. She also found that as a result of endemic warfare with the Sudanese state, guns had acquired much of the symbolic and ritual importance previously held by cattle.

=== Kinship ===
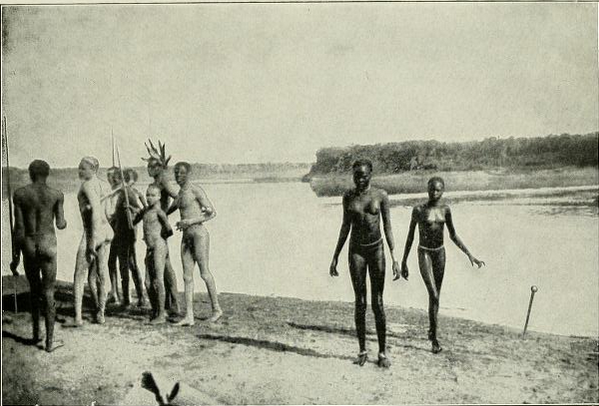
Nuer People, 1906

To a Nuer individual, his parents and siblings are not considered mar (blood relatives) kin. He doesn't refer to them as kin. To him, they are considered gol which is far more intimate and significant. There are kinship categories in the Nuer society. Those categories depend on the payment to them. There is a balance between the mother's and father's sides that is acknowledged through particular formal occasions such as marriage.

==== Kinship roles ====
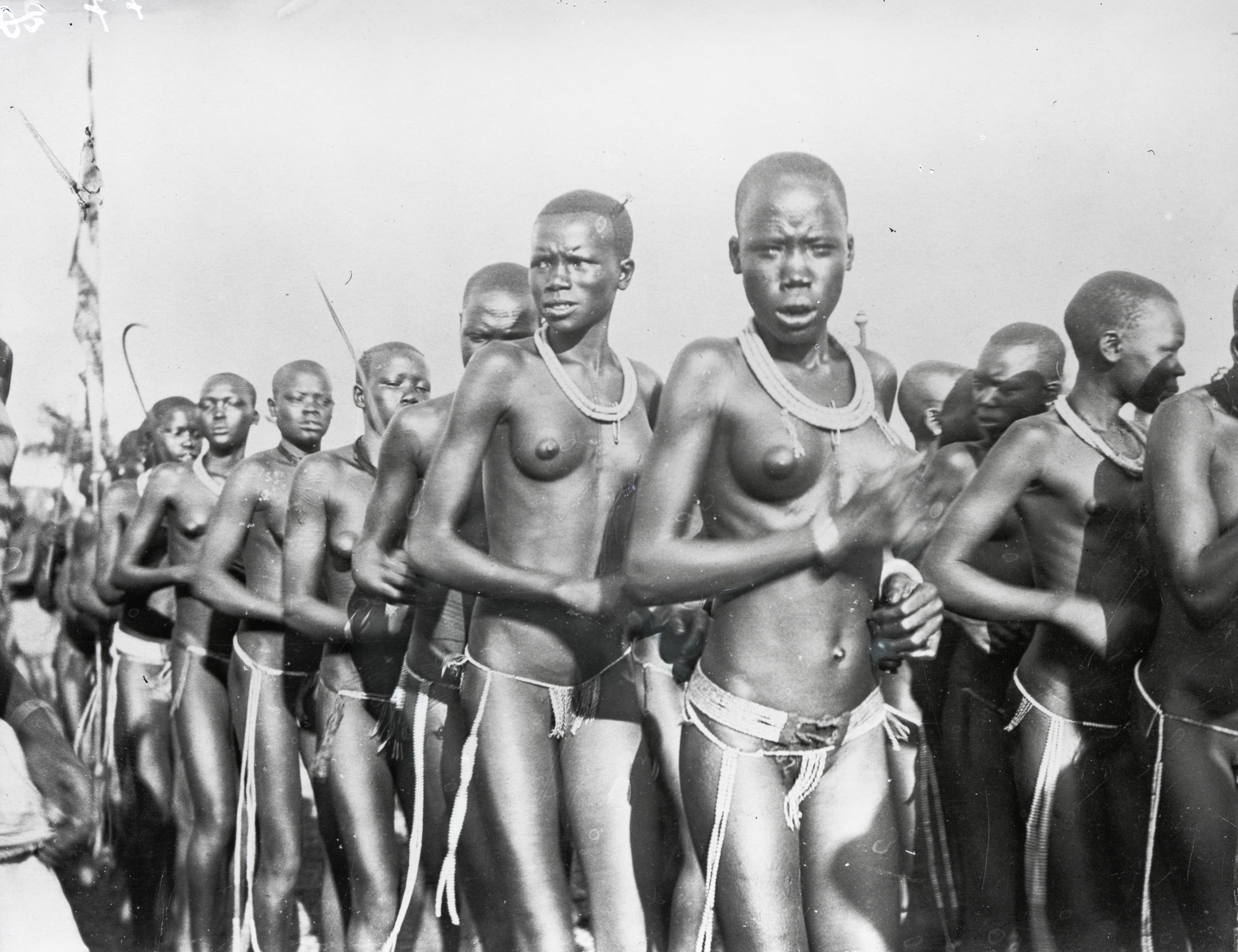
Nuer women, 1930

Kinship among the Nuer is very important to them, they refer to their blood relatives as "gol". Kinship within the Nuer is formed off of one's neighbors or their entire culture. During E. E. Evans-Pritchard's ethnographic observation, he described the role of kinship as: "Kinship obligations include caring for the children of one’s kin and neighbors. He also observed that, "The network of kinship ties which links members of local communities is brought about by the operation of exogamous rules, often stated in terms of cattle." This is never thought to be the sole responsibility of the child's parents." Cattle are judged by how much milk they can produce which is a necessity in their culture. If possible they create an excess of milk into cheese. But if a family’s herd cannot produce the amount of milk a family needs then they turn to others around them to give them what they need. It’s seen as their responsibility to step in and help the family since it’s not really their fault how much their cattle can produce. The entire Nuer society is basically watching after each other, for example, as Evans-Pritchard noted, "When one household has a surplus, it is shared with neighbors. Amassing wealth is not an aim. Although a man who owns a large herd of cattle may be envied, his possession of numerous animals does not garner him any special privilege or treatment". In this tribe there is no special treatment for how one is treated because of their abundance in cattle. Just because one might have more cattle than another doesn't mean they have a higher prestige. If one might have more than enough to provide for themselves, then they also provide that to other kin that are in need, as it is a part of their role in kinship.

Conflict over pastures and cattle raids have been happening between Nuer and Dinka as they battle for grazing ground for their animals. According to Jared Diamond, "...the Nuer observe few restrictions in their treatment of neighboring Dinka tribes: they regularly raid the Dinka, steal Dinka livestock, kill Dinka men, and take home some Dinka women and children as captives while killing the others. But Nuer hostilities against other Nuer tribes consist only of sporadic cattle raids, killing of just a few men, and no killing or kidnapping of women and children."

=== Marriage ===
Nuer girls usually marry at 17 or 18. If a young girl gets engaged at an early age, the wedding and consummation ceremonies are essentially delayed. Women generally give birth to their first children when they are mature enough to bear them. As long as a girl marries a man with cattle, she is able to freely choose her husband, her parents may choose a spouse for her.

Women who act as "female husbands" have been documented in Nuer culture; these women are economically and socially dependent from men and may have their own wives.

=== Religion ===
E. E. Evans-Pritchard studied the Nuer and made very detailed accounts of his interactions. He also describes Nuer cosmology and religion in his books.

Nuer believe that God is the spirit of the sky or the spirit who is in the sky" Kwoth", the creator, but Nuer believe in the coming of God through rain, lightning and thunder, and that the rainbow is the necklace of God. The sun and the moon, as well as other material entities, are also manifestations or signs of God, who, after all is a spirit.

The spirits of the air above are believed to be the most powerful of the lesser spirits, while there are also spirits associated with clan-spears names such as WiW, a spirit of war, associated with thunder. Nuer believe that when a man or a woman dies, the flesh, the life and the soul separate. The flesh is committed to the earth, while the breath or life goes back to God (Kuoth). The soul that signifies the human individuality and personality remains alive as a shadow or a reflection, and departs together with the ox sacrificed, to the place of the ghosts.".

=== Language ===
The people speak the Nuer language / Thoknath which belongs to the Nilo-Saharan language phylum.

=== Ritual ===
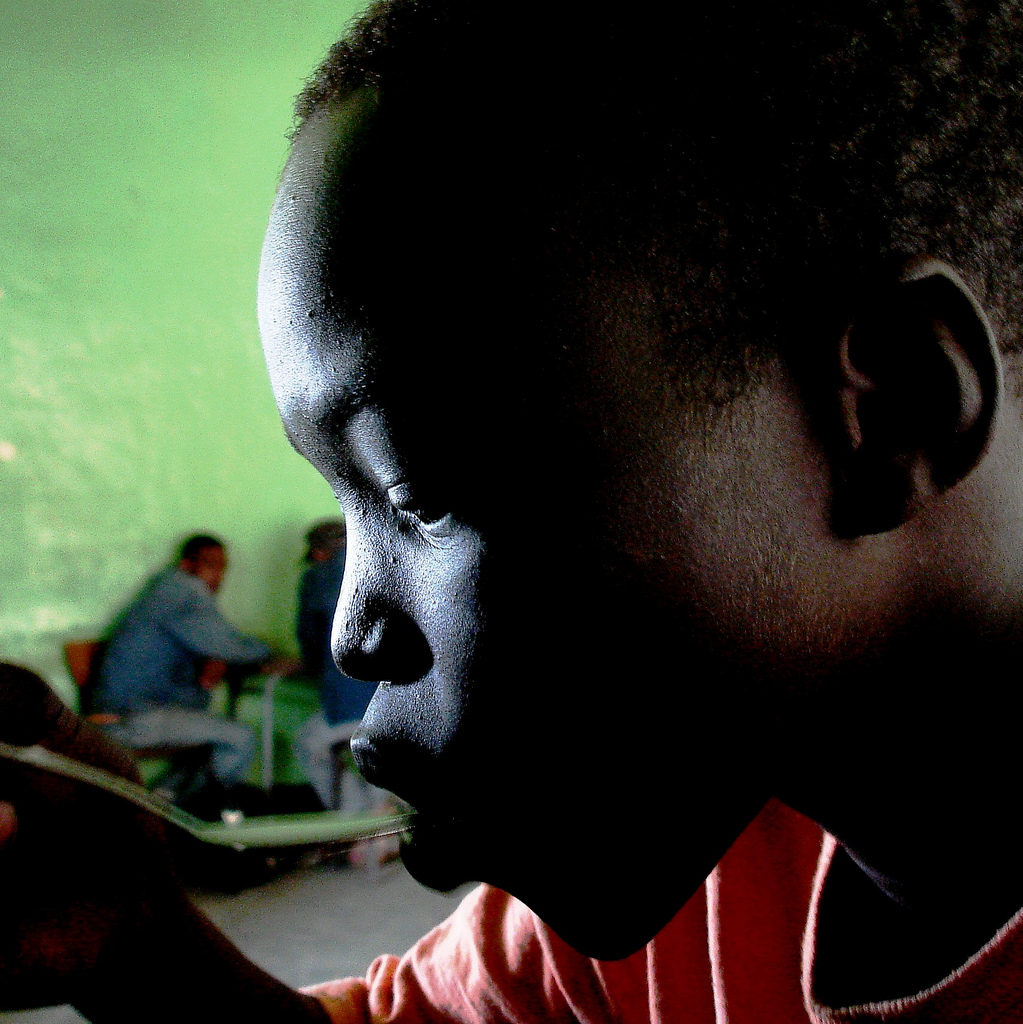
Nuer boy

The Nuer receive facial markings (called gaar) as part of their initiation into adulthood. The pattern of Nuer scarification varies within specific subgroups. The most common initiation pattern among males consists of six parallel horizontal lines, which are cut across the forehead with a razor often with a dip in the lines above the nose. Dotted patterns are also common (especially among the Bul Nuer and among females).

Some Nuer have begun practicing circumcision after being assimilated or partially assimilated in other ethnic groups. The Nuer are not historically known to circumcise, but sometimes circumcise people who have engaged in incest.

Typical foods eaten by the Nuer tribe include beef, goat, cow's milk, mangos, and sorghum in one of three forms: "ko̱p" finely ground, handled until balled and boiled, "walwal" ground, lightly balled and boiled to a solid porridge, and injera / Yɔtyɔt, a large, pancake-like yeast-risen flatbread.

In the early 1990s about 25,000 African refugees were resettled in the United States throughout different locations such as South Dakota, Tennessee and Minnesota. In particular, 4,288 refugees from Sudan were resettled among 36 different states between 1990 and 1997 with the highest number in Texas at 17 percent of the refugee population from Sudan.

The Nuer refugees in the United States and those in Africa continue to observe their social obligations to one another. They use different means ranging from letters to new technologically advanced communication methods in order to stay connected to their families in Africa. Nuer in the United States provide assistance for family members' paperwork to help their migration process to the United States. Furthermore, Nuer in the United States observe family obligations by sending money for those still in Africa.

== Nuer military and political leaders ==
Some important Nuer politicians were,Böth Diew, who was the first Nuer and South Sudan Politician from 1947 followed by Gai Tut. In the Military is Bol Nyawan who fought against the Khartoum government in Bentiu; he was killed in 1985 by the current president of Sudan. Commander Ruai and Liah Diu Deng were responsible for the attack that forced Chevron to suspend activities in the oil field around 1982.

== Naming conventions ==
- (Nya) Nyadä meaning my daughter "And all females name begin with (Nya) of", is the standard prefix used for female names. Gat, meaning " baby of", is a common prefix for male and female gender form as gatnyal(baby girl) and gatdhöl
- Children are commonly given names to mark historical events ("Dɔmaac" meaning "bullet", or Mac meaning "fire or gun" given to a child born during times of war or from another man in the name of the deceased father who legally married the mother ).
- Nhial means "sky", and is a common name for males and females.
- Many Nuer have been exposed to missionaries and carry a Christian first name. Their second name is a given name and always in Nuer. The father's given name follows the child's given name, which is then followed by the grandfather's name, and so on. Many Nuer can easily recount ten generations of paternal lineage because they carry those names themselves.
- When a Nuer comes to the Western world, which wants a first and last name, it is their custom to give their name as their first name followed by their father's name as their middle name and their grandfather's name as their last name.
- After the civil war, the Nuer began accepting cash currency into their economy, changing the dynamics of their cattle and how they were viewed. Each type of cattle is titled according to how they are acquired such as: "the cattle of money" (purchased with cash currency) and "the cattle of girls/daughters" (bridewealth).

Most Nuer people are nicknamed after their cattle. The boys usually chose the name of their favorite cattle based on the form and color of the ox. The girls are named after the cows that they milk. Sometimes the cow names are passed down.

== Oil ==
Oil exploration and drilling began in 1975 and 1976 by companies such as Chevron. In 1979, the first oil production took place in the southern regions of Darfur. In the early 1980s, when the north–south war was happening, Chevron was interested in the reserves in the south. In 1984, guerrillas of Sudan People's Liberation Army (SPLA) attacked the drilling site in the north at Bentiu. In return, Chevron cleared Nuer and Dinka people in the oil fields area to ensure security for their operations.

The Nuer-Dinka struggle in oil fields continued in the late 1990s into the early 2000s. The struggle for oil production was not only manifested in north–south fight, but also in Nuer-Dinka and many internal conflicts among Nuer.

As part of Comprehensive Peace Agreement (CPA), 50 percent of the net revenues of southern oil fields were given to the government of southern Sudan as a solution to one of the sources of decades of civil conflict.

== See also ==
- Nuerland
- Ngundeng Pyramid
- Nuer massacre
- Lost Boys of Sudan
- Dinka tribe
- Anuak people
- Nuer White Army
- Sudanese nomadic conflicts
- Guek Ngundeng
