= South Sudanese wars of independence =

During 1955–1972 and 1983–2005

- Part of the Sudanese Civil Wars
Date	1955–1972, 1983–2005
Location	South Sudan
Result	Stalemate; Comprehensive Peace Agreement; Independence of the Republic of South Sudan following a 2011 referendum; Unresolved issues result in the Sudan–SPLM-N conflict, and the South Sudanese Civil War

Belligerents
Sudan: Sudanese Armed Forces (SAF); Arab militias; Arab Tribes in Sudan	South Sudan: Anyanya; South Sudan People's Defence Forces; South Sudan Liberation Movement; Different Factions and splinter groups

Commanders and leaders
(Sudan) Ismail al-Azhari (Sudan) Gaafar Nimeiry (Sudan) Suwar al-Dahab (Sudan) Sadiq al-Mahdi (Sudan) Omar al-Bashir	Joseph Lagu; Gordon Muortat Mayen; John Garang; Salva Kiir; Dominic Dim Deng; Riek Machar

Casualties and losses
- 2–3 million dead (mostly civilians)

The South Sudanese wars of independence was the armed struggle for autonomy or independence of South Sudan from Sudan. Rebels in southern Sudan fought for greater self-determination against the central government of Sudan, which tried to suppress the uprising using the army and allied militias. The first civil war lasted from 1955 to 1972, and the second civil war from 1983 to 2005. The reasons for the conflict were the large ethnic, cultural, and religious differences between southern and northern Sudan, the economic exploitation of the natural resources of the south by the north, and the lack of political participation of the Southern Sudanese both in their region and in the country as a whole.

States of United Sudan

== Background ==
The population of northern Sudan is largely Arab, Islamic and lighter-skinned, while the population of the south is mainly Christians or adherents of Traditional African religions and consists of black African peoples such as the Nuba, Dinka, Nuer, etc. The lighter-skinned northern Sudanese Arabs considered themselves superior to the dark-skinned southern Sudanese.

Historically, slave traders from northern Sudan hunted slaves in southern Sudan. Partly to prevent this, the colonial power Great Britain administered the north and south separately. In the south, English was used as the official language instead of Arabic, and the activities of Christian missionaries were permitted.

Plans for the decolonization of Sudan initially went in the direction of allowing southern Sudan to become independent as a separate territory or to join neighbouring Uganda to the south. However, at the Juba Conference in 1947, representatives of northern Sudan and the colonial power Great Britain decided that northern Sudan should also receive the provinces of southern Sudan as part of its national territory in the event of future independence. This change of course in British policy is thought to have been caused by the simultaneous rebel activities in Uganda and Kenya, which the British feared could have seized control of South Sudan. A defection to the communist camp was also feared. It is also assumed that the United States exerted influence on the decolonization of the British territories and worked towards subordinating South Sudan to the North to win the sympathy of the future government dominated by the North in the Cold War. The South Sudanese were not involved in this decision.

As a result of this agreement, North Sudan expanded its administration and military in South Sudan, which led to conflicts with the local population, who were now even less involved in the administration of South Sudan. Southern Sudanese were also largely denied participation in the administration and government of Sudan as a whole. When Sudan gained independence at the beginning of 1956, a large-scale civil war broke out between North and South.

== The conflict ==
=== First Civil War ===
On August 18, 1955 - before Sudan gained independence from the Anglo-Egyptian condominium on January 1, 1956 - soldiers rebelled in the city of Torit. This marked the beginning of the armed resistance of the South against the discrimination from the North. The rebels organized themselves into the Anya-Nya rebel group. Their goal was initially the autonomy of South Sudan, but soon independence.

The political parties in northern Sudan rejected demands for autonomy or federalization from the south. Head of state Ibrahim Abbud, who came to power in a military coup in 1958, took brutal action against the rebels in southern Sudan to secure the unity of the country. Numerous villages were burned down in 1958/59. Chiefs and clan leaders were killed, and civilians accused of cooperating with the Anya-Nya were imprisoned and tortured.

The military dictatorship ended in 1964 when Abbud handed over power to a civilian government under Sirr Al-Khatim Al-Khalifa due to public pressure in the north. A round table conference was convened in Khartoum to discuss a solution to the “southern problem” with representatives of the north and south but failed to produce any results due to irreconcilable differences. The South was not involved in the 1965 Sudanese parliamentary election because the security situation was too bad. The new Umma Party government under Muhammad Ahmad Mahgoub stepped up military action against the south, which tended to increase support for the Anya-Nya and independence efforts. The Anya-Nya insurgents in southern Sudan were supplied with weapons, medicine, and propaganda material by Israel from 1969 to 1971. The motivation for this was to weaken the Arab League after the Six-Day War of 1967. Internal party differences between Mahgoub and Sadiq al-Mahdi and the fact that the democratic government was unable to stop the rebellion contributed to Gaafar Nimeiry military coup in 1969, giving way to another military dictatorship.

Soon after taking power, Nimeiry announced that he preferred a political solution to the conflict and sought talks with the rebels from the end of 1971. In February 1972, a ceasefire agreement was finally signed in Addis Ababa. The North granted autonomy and the Southern Sudan Autonomous Region was created, ending a conflict that had claimed some 500,000 to 700,000 lives. This situation lasted for eleven years.

=== Second Civil War ===
Oil and gas concessions in South Sudan 2001

At the beginning of the 1980s, conflicts broke out again as the North gradually encroached on autonomy. In the mid-1970s, Chevron discovered oil deposits in Bentiu in southern Sudan, which aroused the interest of the North. Nimeiry soon decided to pipe the oil to Kosti in the north for processing instead of building a refinery locally. Further tensions were caused by the large-scale Jonglei Canal project, which aimed to transfer water from the south to the water-scarce north. Critics in South Sudan saw this as an exploitation of the South for the benefit of the North and pointed to possible negative consequences for the environment and the livelihoods of the affected population, which had never been consulted on the project.

The concrete trigger of the second civil war was when, in May 1983, army units from Bor, Pibor, and Fashalla refused the order to go north and escaped to Ethiopia. The mutineers were attacked by government troops on May 16, 1983.

Under pressure from the National Islamic Front under Hassan at-Turabi, which was close to the Muslim Brotherhood, President Nimeiry adopted Islamist positions from 1977 onwards. This included the demand to Islamize the south. In September 1983, Nimeiry had Islamic Sharia law introduced for the whole of Sudan. He declared himself “Imam for the whole of Sudan”. Contrary to the peace agreement, he had the south divided into three provinces and placed the province with the oil reserves directly under his government in Khartoum.

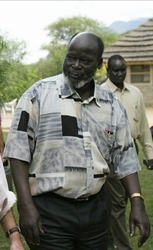
John Garang, leader of the SPLA/M

As a result, the SPLM (Sudanese People Liberation Movement) and its armed wing, the SPLA (Sudanese People Liberation Army), led by Colonel John Garang, were founded in the south in the same year. In 1989, 30,000 SPLA fighters battled against 58,000 soldiers of the Sudanese central government, which was supported by Saudi Arabia and Libya. The SPLA controlled almost the entire south of Sudan, except for the garrison towns of Malakal, Wau and Juba.

At the beginning of 1989, after tough negotiations, the international community managed to wrest concessions from President Sadiq al-Mahdi to such an extent that Operation Lifeline Sudan was able to start supplying the starving population in the war zones. The beginning of a peace process that was just beginning to emerge was destroyed by Omar al-Bashir 's coup d'état on June 30, 1989 which ousted al-Mahdi.

The example of Ed Daein, a small town on the railroad line east of Nyala, shows how battles for scarce resources were fought along ethnic lines during the Civil War. The town used to be one of the trading centers for slaves, was classified as particularly dangerous for aid organizations by USAID at the end of 2007 due to the Darfur conflict that broke out in 2003 and was the scene of a massacre 20 years earlier, in early 1987. By May 1986, 17,000 Dinka had fled from the south to the supposedly peaceful El Diein, where there were occasional clashes with the local Fur and Zaghawa at the scarce water points. The situation escalated when Baggara attacked Dinka villages in January 1987. SPLA fighters then attacked these Arab militias, killed over 150 Baggara, and returned 4000 cattle to Dinka possession. On March 27, 1987, a group of armed Baggara attacked Dinka who had gathered in a church. A mob formed and rampaged through Dinka neighborhoods, beating those fleeing with sticks. The next day, a fire was set on a train full of Dinka preparing to leave. UNICEF estimated the death toll at up to 1500, Amnesty International later confirmed that 426 Dinka had been killed. Most of them were women and children.

By 1991, the SPLA had managed to control almost all of southern Sudan, but the military situation shifted to the detriment of the SPLA, as the Sudanese refugee camps in neighboring Ethiopia, which had been a supply base for the SPLA, were dissolved after the fall of the socialist Derg and 100,000 Sudanese were forced to return to Sudan. Their supplies now had to be decentralized and provided in the middle of the war zone. In addition, individual groups split from the SPLA. On August 28, 1991, a militant faction of the Nuer in Nasir broke away from Garang, who belonged to the Dinka, as the Nasir faction, allegedly out of dissatisfaction because Garang was unable to implement his democratic concept in the “liberated areas”. This is said to have led to the same level of cruelty between the two ethnic groups as between “Arabs” and black Africans. As the government in Khartoum supplied the Nuer with weapons, the inter-ethnic conflicts in the region around Bor were further exacerbated. According to an eyewitness report, on January 22, 1992, “a thousand men with modern infantry weapons” (Nuer SPLA fighters) razed four Dinka villages to the ground. One of Nasir's three rebel SPLA officers, Riek Machar, was presented to the Nuer as the new messiah. The total number of Dinka killed around Bor was estimated at over 1000, and a large part of the cattle population (50,000 to 100,000 animals) is also said to have been killed or stolen, which led to a famine.

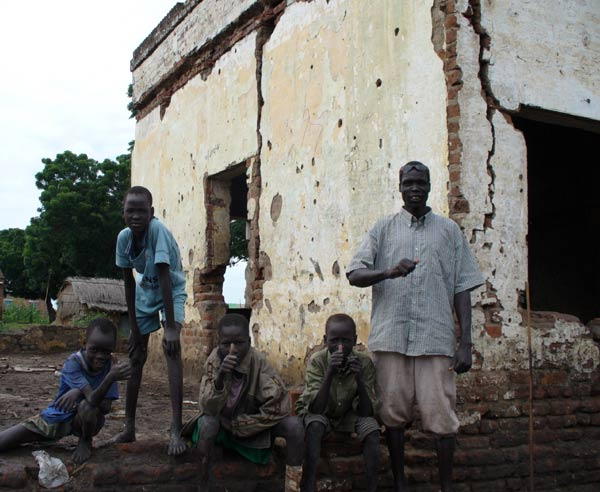
Destroyed building in Nasir, South Sudan

In 1992, the government in Khartoum launched a counter-offensive and was able to push back some of the rebels. In February 1993, Kerubino Kwanyin Bol joined as a third rebel faction. He had been one of the founders of the SPLA and second in command. He was arrested by Garang in 1987, managed to escape at the end of 1992, and, with the support of the government, took part in attacks on civilians and looting at the beginning of 1993. Here too, rebel infighting claimed more lives than the fight against the North. The secessionist groups reunited in April 1993. By the end of 1993, the Sudanese government was back in control of almost all the major towns in the south. The year 1996 was seen as the high point of cooperation between the Sudanese government and the Ugandan rebel movement, the Lord's Resistance Army (LRA), which, according to human rights organizations, may have received support from Khartoum for its attacks against civilian targets in the south until around 2005.

The conflict took another turn when the SPLA allied itself with the National Democratic Alliance (NDA) in June 1995. The NDA was an alliance of various opposition groups in the north. Although the NDA consisted of individual groups with very different interests, their common goal was the removal of the Islamist dictatorship in Khartoum under Omar al-Bashir. By 1996, the alliance had made significant territorial gains.

In 1999, the government gave in to pressure for the first time and decided to reintroduce a multi-party system. As a result, the first opposition group left the NDA in 2000 and switched to the government. After the introduction of the multi-party system, the NDA became more and more insignificant.

After the conclusion of the Bürgenstock Agreement in January 2002, which ended the civil war in the Nuba Mountains, the government finally agreed to peace talks with the SPLA under pressure from the United States. From 2003 to 2004, representatives of the government and the SPLA met repeatedly in Nairobi for negotiations.

A breakthrough was finally achieved in January 2005. After 22 years of civil war between the predominantly Christian and Animist south and the Muslim north, the Comprehensive Peace Agreement was signed.

== The peace agreement ==
North Sudan Darfur Eastern Front, area of operations July 2006 South Sudan (held referendum in 2011) Abyei (scheduled in CPA to hold referendum in 2011, postponed indefinitely as of May 2011) States to hold "popular consultations" in 2011: South Kurdufan (process suspended) and Blue Nile (status unclear)

In the peace agreement concluded between the government and the SPLA in 2005, it was agreed to create an autonomous region of southern Sudan, which is to be administered largely independently by the SPLM. Sharia law was suspended in the south and was applied to Muslims in the north. The revenue from the oil reserves in South Sudan would be divided equally between the South and the North. The sometimes disputed borders between North and South Sudan were to be defined. Furthermore, the formation of a government of national unity was agreed upon for the whole of Sudan, in which the ruling National Congress Party (NCP) and the SPLM would participate on an equal footing. The leader of the SPLM assumed the office of Vice President. The United Nations Mission in Sudan (UNMIS) monitored compliance with the peace agreement. A referendum was scheduled for 2011 in which the South Sudanese would decide between independence and remaining part of the whole of Sudan.

== Results and consequences ==
As a result of the conflict, the civilian population suffered from famine, the deportation of civilians as slaves to northern Sudan, displacement, and the destruction of livelihoods. The great famine of 1998 was instrumentalized by the parties to the conflict, if not in some cases deliberately brought about. The rival SPLA faction of Kerubino Kwanyin Bol, which operated in the north of Bahr al-Ghazal, was again supported by Khartoum during this time

The total death toll from the second civil war in South Sudan is estimated at more than two million, most of them South Sudanese civilians. Four million South Sudanese were displaced and have been gradually returning since the end of the war. Supplying the returnees is a problem, as South Sudan's agriculture was also severely affected by the war. The already sparse infrastructure in the south was largely destroyed.

After the peace agreement was signed, there have been several clashes between northern and southern troops. The heaviest fighting took place in the Abyei region in May 2008, however these did not escalate into a new war. Since 2009, the Abyei region has had a special administrative status and belongs to both Sudan and South Sudan.

The start of peace talks with South Sudan made the black African population in Darfur feel even more neglected. In 2003, the JEM carried out the first attack on the ongoing Darfur conflict. Since the peace treaty was signed, the dissatisfaction of the population in the border region of the Nuba Mountains has grown. They complain that they have been ignored by the north and south.

Per the peace agreement, the 2011 independence referendum was held in South Sudan in January 2011, in which almost 99% of voters were in favor of independence. South Sudan became independent on July 9, 2011.

However, the independence of South Sudan has not ended the fighting. The United Nations High Commissioner for Refugees (UNHCR) reported that since independence, fighting between Sudanese and South Sudanese troops in the Sudanese states of South Kordofan and Blue Nile has forced 200,000 more people to flee their homes. The South Sudanese Civil War started in 2013, devastating the newly independent South Sudan and claiming around 200,000 lives until 2018.
