= Abyei border conflict =

Conflict in South Sudan

- Part of the ethnic violence in South Sudan
- Military situation in Abyei Under control of the Government of South Sudan and Allies Under control of the Sudan People's Liberation Movement-in-Opposition and Allies Under control of the Government of Peace and Unity Under control of the UNISFA
Date	February 10, 2022 – April 10, 2023; September 23, 2023 – present
Location	Twic, South Sudan and Abyei
Result	Ongoing

Belligerents
Twic Dinka; Bul Nuer; SSPDF 3rd Division (since November 2023); Titweng	Ngok Dinka; Nuer from Unity State (since September 2023)	UNISFA; South Sudan

Commanders and leaders
Akuei Ajou Akuei; Stephen Buay Rolnyang; Gai Machiek	Belbel Kuol Deng	Benjamin Sawyerr; Kuol Deim Kuol; Chol Deng Alaak

Casualties and losses
Unknown	Unknown	Unknown
- Hundreds killed, dozens injured 50,000 refugees

Between February 2022 and April 2023, clashes broke out in the Abyei area of South Sudan between Twic Dinka militias against Ngok Dinka militias, regarding control of the border between Abyei and South Sudan's Twic County. The conflict ended temporarily following a ceasefire between the Twic Dinka and Ngok Dinka in May 2023. In September 2023, attacks flared up in the border area between Abyei and Twic County between Twic Dinka and Ngok Dinka youth, with several massacres against Ngok Dinka.

== Prelude ==
The Abyei area is inhabited by the Ngok Dinka, a sub-group of the Dinka people who live in South Sudan. In the early 1900s, Misseriya Arabs moved to the area following the British conquest. Following the independence of South Sudan from Sudan in 2011, Abyei was left as a disputed area as no side wanted to give up the rich oilfields in the region. A short war broke out in 2012 over the area, but was resolved by the creation of the United Nations Interim Security Force for Abyei (UNISFA). As of 2024, South Sudan holds de facto control over the area.

Most inter-communal violence is driven by Misseriya Arabs against the Ngok Dinka. Due to land disputes between the nomadic Misseriya and farming Ngok combined with climate change exacerbating dry seasons, Misseriya Arabs have encroached on Ngok Dinka land for many years. The Misseriya are also the only group that boycotted the 2013 referendum proposing Abyei fall under South Sudanese control, instead favoring Sudanese rule.

== Conflict ==
=== Initial attacks ===
The first attack happened on February 10, 2022, after Twic Dinka youths were beaten by Ngok Dinka Police who were with Abyei administrators surveying land on the Twic-Twic State. The surveyors were at the Aneet market whenever the Twic youth sent by Twic tax collectors attacked the surveyors. Four people had been killed by the time UNISFA was sent to relieve tensions. Twelve others were wounded in the attack. The death toll later increased to 27 dead and 26 injured, according to Abyei Security Advisor Kiluk Kon.

By March 6, over 50,000 refugees had fled to Abyei town due to the Twic attacks and by an attack in Mading-thon and Kuol Bol by Misseriya Arabs. Between March and April, attacks occurred in Nong, Lu, and Kolom. The Nong attack killed seven people, the Lu attack killed five and one was injured, and in Kon, four people were killed. Around 2,000 heads of cattle were stolen in Lu as well. Kon also stated that in the attacks, the perpetrators wore the uniform of the Sudanese Armed Forces.

In May 2022, the SSPDF intervened in the area. South Sudanese President Salva Kiir also announced the creation of a panel to assess and relieve the violence. Peace talks also began in Entebbe, Uganda in May between Ngok Dinka and Misseriya tribal leaders, sponsored by the Community Empowerment for Progress Organization, a South Sudanese aid organization.

=== Intensification of the Twic Dinka-Ngok Dinka border conflict ===
Starting in June 2022, and intensifying in September and October 2022, Ngok Dinka and Twic Dinka clashed at the borders of Abyei and Twic states. The SSPDF intervened a second time, and a CEPO-mediated peace negotiation saw a peace treaty between Twic and Ngok Dinka. However, fighting re-erupted in December 2022 at the village of Wou Chien on the Abyei-Twic border.

In January 2023, an attack by around 200 Twic Dinka and Bul Nuer led by former SPLM commander Stephen Buay Rolnyang attacked the Abyei village of Rumamier, killing thirteen civilians and aid workers, and injuring four others. UNISFA troops intervened, but the village was burnt down. A week later, three people were killed and two injured by Ngok Dinka militants in Twic State. On January 27, battles between the Bul Nuer and Ngok Dinka saw several dozen civilians killed and hundreds of cattle stolen in the Abyei villages of Tong Liet, Makoac-Madou, and Makeibum. Due to the violence, Abyei chief administrator Kuol Deim Kuol resigned after protests. Kuol, however, alleged that officials from Warrap and Abyei were behind the violence. The new administrator, Chol Deng Alaak, vowed to establish peace.

On February 28, UNISFA denounced the movement of South Sudanese armed forces to Abyei. A second peace treaty between the Twic Dinka and Ngok Dinka was signed in Wau on April 6. However, the Ngok Dinka sultan, Belbek Kuol Deng, stated that attacks by Misseriya Arabs still continued against Ngok Dinka communities. At the outbreak of the War in Sudan on April 15, tensions rose between the Twic, Misseriya, and Ngok Dinka, but no attacks were reported. On April 9, eleven people were killed in an ambush in Akol Matnyang, Rumamer county, by Rolnyang's South Sudan People's Movement/Army.

=== War in Sudan and ceasefire ===
The United Nations postponed the deployment of additional peacekeepers in UNISFA to Abyei in May 2023, following the breakout of the war in Sudan. The UN also expressed concern that the war would collapse the ceasefire that was agreed upon in Abyei, and restart attacks. Both Sudanese and South Sudanese forces deployed to the area following the war, in violation of the demilitarization delineated in the ceasefire. A South Sudanese internal report stated that neutral mediators of the 2022–2023 clashes picked sides, and that a neutral mediator of the conflict shouldn't be from Bahr el Ghazal.

Five people were killed and six were injured in the Hafir El Sillik area of Abyei on May 22. Ngok Dinka sultan Deng stated that the Misseriya were not involved in the attack, and other sources stated that an SSPDF-affiliated militia called Titabai was the perpetrator. That same day, the Ghanaian Battalion of UNISFA had luggage looted en route to Abyei. Four Twic Dinka were killed and one Abyei civilian was killed in a botched cattle raid attempt by the Twic Dinka on June 21.

=== Second spate of fighting ===
On September 23, 2023, Twic Dinka attacked a market in Athony, but nobody was killed or injured. A second raid occurred on September 27 in Manyiel Rou, and six cows were stolen and the owner was killed. That same day, a driver in Buol Kech was killed. More bandits attacked Nyinkuec on September 30, killing fourteen people and injuring fourteen others. Twic County officials claimed that no such attack happened. Abyei officials imposed a curfew in response to the Nyinkuec attack. Twic youth attacked Athony again on October 4, killing four Abyei youth and one Twic fighter. Three Abyei civilians were injured. According to officials in Abyei, instead of a cattle raid, this attack was intended by the Twic to occupy the village. While SSPDF exercised control of the area after the attack, fears of reprisal attacks were imminent.

Ngok Dinka youth and fighters from Unity State launched a reprisal attack on October 25 in Buombil, Twic County, killing two SSPDF soldiers and three children. Five others were injured as well. The situation calmed down following the Buombil attack, and no attacks were reported for almost a month.

On November 19, 2023, Ngok Dinka fighters attacked an SSPDF base in Ayouk, killing eight soldiers and eleven of their family members, with four Ngok Dinka and Nuer youth killed. Twic County officials claimed the attack took place in Twic territory, and that thirty-five soldiers and civilians were killed in the attack. Sultan Kuol Deng claimed that the Ayouk raid was instigated by Twic youth and SSPDF fighters, who initially attacked Ngok Dinka in preparation for an attack in Abyei.

SSPDF forces under General Akuei Ajou, who survived the Ayouk raid, attacked civilians in Rumamer and Alal counties on November 19 following the raid. Twic and SSPDF forces attacked the villages of Angot, Wincuei and Nyiel, killing a Ghanaian peacekeeper, and six fighters. Abyei officials also accused Gai Machiek's militia called Titweng of aiding the SSPDF and Twic youth. Twenty-seven people were killed in the first attack in Mayot, and the second attack in Maluel Aleu was repulsed by UNISFA intervening against the SSPDF and Titweng. Twenty people were injured in the attacks, and five were killed in Maluel Aleu as well. Ajou denied the involvement of the SSPDF during the raids, and called for peace between Twic and Ngok Dinka. UNISFA also reported no peacekeepers were killed. The toll of the attacks grew to forty-seven civilians killed and thirty-four injured, with the affected villages being Ayuok, Athony, Malual Aleu, Ka-dhian, Nyiel, Angot Wuncuei, and Wunpeeth, according to the Abyei Civil Society Organization.

UNISFA urged officials on November 23 to investigate the killings at the Ayouk raid and in the November 19 attacks, and asserted that seventy-five people were killed during the latter. Protests then broke out on November 27 in towns across Abyei decrying UNISFA's lack of protection of Abyei communities, and for the withdrawal of SSPDF and the Sudanese Armed Forces.

Clashes broke out again between Twic Dinka and Ngok Dinka in Athony and other border villages on December 3, killing six people and injuring thirty-five others. The attacks were reportedly started by Twic raids. On December 14, one person was killed and four others injured in border attacks, with both Abyei and Twic officials trading blame. A similar attack occurred on December 20 on the border, with Abyei officials claiming the deaths of six Twic youth. On December 31, the deputy administrator of Abyei, Noon Deng, was killed with five others in Rummamer county by unknown gunmen. Noon Deng's killing was deplored by UNISFA.

On January 2, 2024, fighting broke out between SSPDF's 3rd Division led by Ajou along with Gal Machiek's militia against SSPDF forces led by General Kuel Garang, killing five people and injuring an unknown number more. Border attacks continued throughout January 2024, mostly with kidnappings and cattle and sheep raids. Attacks were uncommon.

==== Gai Machiek's campaign ====
On January 27, 2024, Twic Dinka attacked the border villages of Nyinhuac, Majbong, and Ka-dhian and killed over fifty-three people and injured over sixty-four others. The attack was repelled by UNISFA, who lost two peacekeepers. The perpetrators of the attack were also associated with Gai Machiek. Between February 3 and 4, Machiek's militia launched attacks on Mijak, Aleel, and Rummamer counties. The first attack occurred at 10:30am in Rummamer county, where one person was killed and one was injured. Further attacks occurred in Mijak county around 3pm, where fourteen people were killed when their houses were burned. Another attack occurred in Aleel county, leading to the deaths of four civilians, and one in Machbong, where a market was torched. Nineteen people were killed and eighteen were injured in the February 3 attacks. Further attacks the next day killed eighteen people and saw Twic Dinka and Gai Machiek's militants steal 1,000 heads of cattle.

== Reactions ==
The United Nations called for peace in the region in May 2023. UNISFA also congratulated the initial ceasefire in April 2023.

Countries

- China expressed concern that the war in Sudan would restart conflict in Abyei in May 2023.
- France called for peace in the region in May 2023.

Supranational organizations

- The United Nations also expressed concern that the war in Sudan would restart conflict in Abyei in May 2023.
