= Abyei (town) =

Abyei أبيي
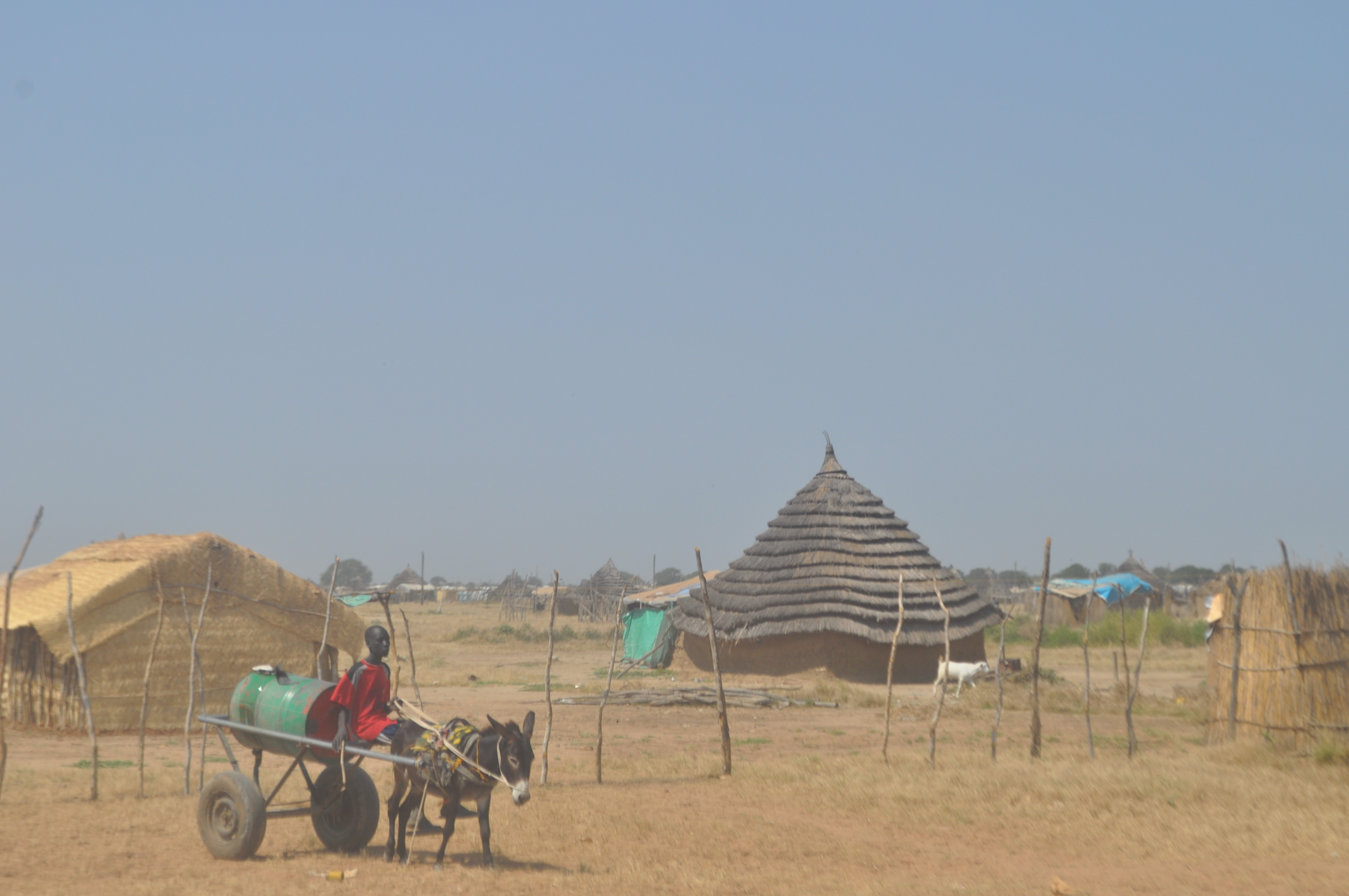
- View of Abyei town, with traditional dwellings (2009)

- Location relative to the Sudan and South Sudan. Abyei (South Sudan)
- Coordinates: 09°35′44″N 28°26′13″E
- Country: South Sudan; Sudan
- Administrative area: Abyei Area
- Elevation: 1,300 ft (400 m)
- Time zone: UTC+2

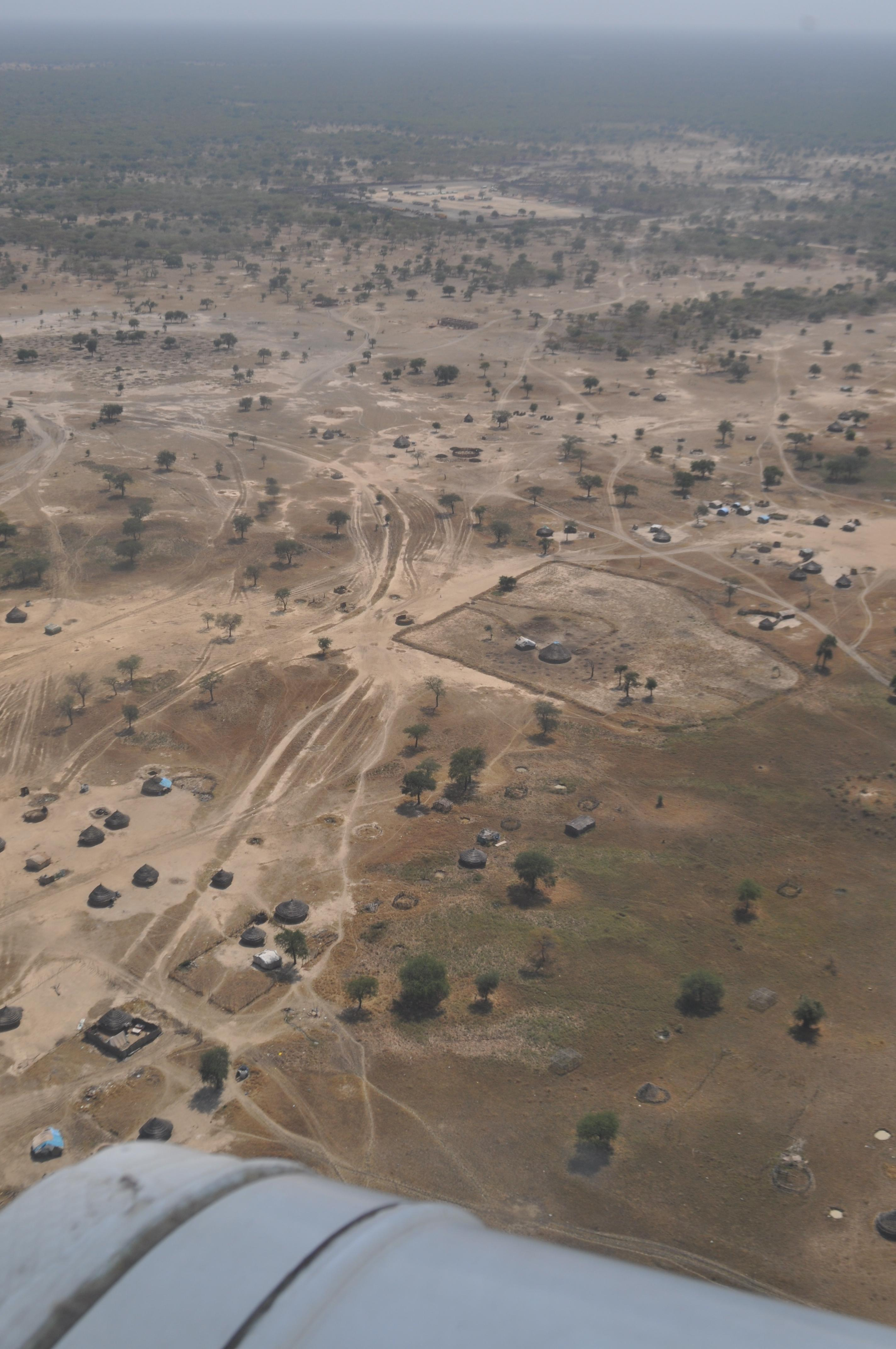
Aerial view of Abyei town and environs, in 2009

Abyei (also spelled Abyēy; Arabic: أبيي) is a border town currently in the Abyei Area that is jointly administered by South Sudan and Sudan. The United Nations estimated the town's population at around 20,000 previous to May 2011 events.

The oil-producing and fertile Abyei Area, with Abyei town as its center, is a disputed territorial point of contention in the July 2011 secession of South Sudan process.

== History ==
=== 2008 conflict ===
Abyei town was almost completely destroyed in May 2008 when tensions escalated between the Sudan People's Liberation Army/Movement (SPLA) and the Sudanese Armed Forces (SAF) after the Government of South Sudan appointed an administrator for the region, a move the Messiria objected to.

=== 2009 ===
Some 50,000 of Abyei Town's mostly Dinka inhabitants fled southwards, to Agok in present South Sudan. Since the signing of the roadmap for the return of the displaced and the implementation of the Abyei Protocol in the Comprehensive Peace Agreement, much of the town was rebuilt by mid-2009.

=== 2011 ===
==== Abyei referendum ====
Whether Abyei Area and town would remain part of the South Kordofan region of northern Sudan or become part of the Bahr el Ghazal region of South Sudan (Republic of South Sudan) was to be decided by a local referendum in 2011. Disagreements over the process, and the recent violent takeover, raised questions whether a vote will be held.

==== Takeover ====
The northern Sudan military succeeded in their forceful takeover of Abyei Area and town on 21 May 2011. A week after the takeover, satellite images show that the northern Sudan army burned and razed about one-third of all civilian buildings in the town during the violence. Tens of thousands of Abyei Area civilians, including up to 35,000 children, have been internally displaced by the northern takeover. The satellite image evidence, supporting a claim of state-sponsored ethnic cleansing of much of the contested Abyei town and region, is being submitted to the International Criminal Court (ICC) and the UN Security Council for assessment.

== Climate ==
Abyei has a hot semi-arid climate (BSh) bordering a tropical savanna climate (Aw) under the Köppen climate classification.

Climate data for Abyei (town)
Month	Jan	Feb	Mar	Apr	May	Jun	Jul	Aug	Sep	Oct	Nov	Dec	Year
Mean daily maximum °C (°F)	34.9 (94.8)	36.3 (97.3)	38.4 (101.1)	38.8 (101.8)	36.8 (98.2)	34.1 (93.4)	31.7 (89.1)	31.2 (88.2)	32.3 (90.1)	33.9 (93.0)	34.9 (94.8)	34.6 (94.3)	34.8 (94.7)
Daily mean °C (°F)	25.9 (78.6)	27.5 (81.5)	29.9 (85.8)	30.8 (87.4)	30 (86)	28.3 (82.9)	26.7 (80.1)	26.2 (79.2)	26.8 (80.2)	27.4 (81.3)	27.1 (80.8)	26 (79)	27.7 (81.9)
Mean daily minimum °C (°F)	17 (63)	18.7 (65.7)	21.5 (70.7)	22.8 (73.0)	23.3 (73.9)	22.5 (72.5)	21.8 (71.2)	21.3 (70.3)	21.4 (70.5)	21 (70)	19.4 (66.9)	17.4 (63.3)	20.7 (69.2)
Average precipitation mm (inches)	0 (0)	0 (0)	3 (0.1)	17 (0.7)	72 (2.8)	124 (4.9)	163 (6.4)	185 (7.3)	141 (5.6)	58 (2.3)	2 (0.1)	0 (0)	765 (30.2)
Source: Climate-Data.org

== See also ==
- 2011 South Sudanese independence referendum
- Comprehensive Peace Agreement (CPA)
