= United Nations Security Council Resolution 1990 =

UN Security Council Resolution 1990
- Disputed Abyei region (dark red) in South Kordofan
- Date: 27 June 2011
- Meeting no.: 6,567
- Code: S/RES/1990 (Document)
- Subject: The situation in Sudan
- Voting summary: 15 voted for; None voted against; None abstained
- Result: Adopted

Security Council composition
- Permanent members: China; France; Russia; United Kingdom; United States
- Non-permanent members: Bosnia–Herzegovina; Brazil; Colombia; Germany; Gabon; India; Lebanon; Nigeria; Portugal; South Africa

United Nations Security Council Resolution 1990, adopted unanimously on June 27, 2011, after recalling all previous resolutions on the situation in Sudan and the Comprehensive Peace Agreement, the Council established the United Nations Interim Security Force for Abyei (UNISFA) in the disputed Abyei region between Sudan and South Sudan.

The resolution was passed after a conflict between the Sudan People's Liberation Army/Movement (SPLA/M) and Sudanese army in the South Kordofan region, and in the run-up to the declaration of independence by South Sudan from the north. The resolution was drafted by the United States.

== Resolution ==
=== Observations ===
The Security Council noted that, on June 20, 2011, there was an agreement between Sudanese government and SPLA/M over the administration and security of the Abyei region. It expressed concern about the situation in the region and the violence committed against the civilian population. Both parties were invited to pursue constructive negotiations on the status of Abyei, ensure the return of internally displaced persons and facilitate humanitarian access.

=== Acts ===
The Ethiopian UNIFSA peacekeeping mission was established for an initial period of six months. Ethiopian General Tadesse Werede Tesfay was appointed first Head of Mission and Force Commander. The force would consist of 4,200 soldiers, 50 police and support personnel with the following mandate:

- Monitor the demilitarisation of the Abyei region;
- Participate in regional organisations;
- Contribute to demining activities;
- Facilitate the delivery of humanitarian aid;
- Support the capacity of the police service and protect oil installations.

Under Chapter VII of the United Nations Charter, UNIFSA was authorised to take "necessary actions" in order to:

- Protect UNISFA personnel, equipment and facilities;
- Protect United Nations personnel, equipment and facilities;
- Ensure the safety and freedom of movement of United Nations and humanitarian personnel;
- Protect civilians in danger;
- Protect Abyei against attacks from outside;
- Ensure security in the region.

The Secretary-General Ban Ki-moon was asked to conclude a status of forces agreement with Sudan. Sudan and other states were requested to co-operate fully with UNIFSA and the Secretary-General had to provide a progress report including the monitoring of human rights.

== See also ==
- List of United Nations Security Council Resolutions 1901 to 2000 (2009 – 2011)
- Second Sudanese Civil War
- South Kordofan conflict
- Southern Sudanese independence referendum, 2011
- War in Darfur
