= November 2023 Abyei border attacks =

- Part of Abyei border conflict (2022-present)
- Location: Abyei-Twic County border, South Sudan
- Date: November 19, 2023
- Target: Ngok Dinka
- Deaths: 47+
- Injuries: 34+
- Perpetrators: Twic Dinka; SSPDF 3rd Division

On November 19, 2023, Twic Dinka youth and soldiers from the 3rd Division of the South Sudan People's Defence Forces (SSPDF) attacked several villages along the border between Abyei and Twic County, killing over forty-seven people and injuring thirty-four others.

== Background ==
Dinka from Twic County south of Abyei have been involved in a border conflict with Abyei's Ngok Dinka over land and cattle since February 2022. Despite a peace agreement in April 2023, clashes broke out again in September 2023 with Twic Dinka killing Ngok Dinka civilians in raids on border towns.

Ngok Dinka and Nuer mercenaries from Unity State attacked Twic Dinka and aligned SSPDF forces at the SSPDF 3rd Division's base in the border town of Ayuok on November 10, killing thirty-four soldiers and their families, and injuring thirty-two others.

== Attacks ==
Following the massacre at the Ayuok base, the head of the 3rd division, General Akuei Ajou, aligned with Twic Dinka forces known as Titweng, and a militia led by Gal Machiek. The attack began on November 19 in the border area between Rummamer County and Alal County. The initial toll given by Abyei officials was twenty-seven killed by SSPDF in the village of Mayot in Rummamer, including the county's former commissioner, before the Titweng and Gal Machiek militias headed to Maluel Aleu, a village in Alal County. There, UNISFA forces intervened in the conflict, repulsing the militias.

Ministers from Abyei stated that this attack was the first during the border conflict in which SSPDF targeted Ngok Dinka civilians. The attacks sparked protests in Abyei, with civilians urging SSPDF to leave the disputed region. A statement from the protest by the Abyei Civil Society stated that the attacks killed over forty-seven civilians and thirty-four injured, and that the villages of Ayuok, Athony, Malual Aleu, Ka-dhian, Nyiel, Angot Wuncuei, and Wunpeeth were targeted.

The commander of the 3rd Division, Gen. Ajou, claimed that the SSPDF was not involved in the attacks. UNISFA denied claims by Abyei officials about the death of a Ghanaian peacekeeper in the attacks.
