= Southern Sudan Autonomous Region (2005–2011) =

Former autonomous region of Sudan

Southern Sudan حكومة جنوب السودان Ḥukūmat Janūb as-Sūdān
- Autonomous region of Sudan
- 2005–2011
- Flag Emblem

- Map showing Southern Sudan (red) within Sudan (darker brown).
- Capital: Juba
- Area
  - 2008: 644,329 km^{2} (248,777 sq mi)
- Population
  - 2008: 8,260,490
- Government
  - Type: Autonomous region
- President
  - 2005: John Garang
  - 2005–2011: Salva Kiir
- Legislature: Legislative Assembly
- History
  - Established: 9 July 2005
  - Independence: 9 July 2011
Preceded by	Succeeded by
Republic of Sudan	Republic of South Sudan
- Today part of: South Sudan

Southern Sudan (Arabic: حكومة جنوب السودان Ḥukūmat Janūb as-Sūdān; Dinka: Lɔ̈k Bïkrotmac Paguot Thudän) was an autonomous region consisting of the ten southern states of Sudan between its formation in July 2005 and independence as the Republic of South Sudan in July 2011. The autonomous government was initially established in Rumbek and later moved to Juba. It was bordered by Ethiopia to the east; Kenya, Uganda, and the Democratic Republic of the Congo to the south; and the Central African Republic to the west. To the north lies the predominantly Arab and Muslim region directly under the control of the central government. The region's autonomous status was a condition of a peace agreement between the Sudan People's Liberation Army/Movement (SPLA/M) and the Government of Sudan represented by the National Congress Party ending the Second Sudanese Civil War. The conflict was Africa's longest running civil war.

== History ==
Egypt, under the rule of Khedive Isma'il Pasha, first attempted to colonise the region in the 1870s, establishing the province of Equatoria in the southern portion. Egypt's first governor was Samuel Baker, commissioned in 1869, followed by Charles George Gordon in 1874 and by Emin Pasha in 1878. The Mahdist War of the 1880s destabilised the nascent province, and Equatoria ceased to exist as an Egyptian outpost in 1889. Important settlements in Equatoria included Lado, Gondokoro, Dufile and Wadelai. In 1947, British hopes to join the southern part of Sudan with Uganda were dashed by the Juba Conference, to unify northern and southern Sudan.

=== Civil war ===
The region was affected by two civil wars since Sudanese independence – the Sudanese government fought the Anyanya rebel army from 1955 to 1972 in the First Sudanese Civil War and then SPLA/M in the Second Sudanese Civil War for almost twenty-one years after the founding of SPLA/M in 1983 – resulting in serious neglect, lack of infrastructural development, and major destruction and displacement. More than 2.5 million people were killed, and more than 5 million were externally displaced while others have been internally displaced, becoming refugees as a result of the civil war and war-related impacts.

=== Peace agreement and autonomy ===
On 9 January 2005, a peace treaty was signed in Nairobi, Kenya, ending the Second Sudanese Civil War and reestablishing Southern autonomy. John Garang, then leader of the Sudan People's Liberation Army/Movement, feted the treaty, predicting, "This peace agreement will change Sudan forever." The treaty provided for a referendum on South Sudanese independence to be held on 9 January 2011, six years after the original signing. It also divided oil income evenly between the North and the South.

Use of sharia law continued in the Muslim-majority North, while in Southern Sudan, its authority was devolved to the elected assembly. Southern Sudan ultimately rejected implementation of sharia law. In late 2010, Sudanese President Omar al-Bashir announced that if Southern Sudan voted for independence, Sudan would fully adopt sharia as the basis for law.

President Salva Kiir and the SPLA disputed the results of the 2008 Sudanese census, which claimed Southern Sudan accounted for 21 percent of the population. The SPLA insisted that Southern Sudan included closer to one-third of the national population and that Southern Sudanese had been undercounted.

=== Referendum for independence (2011) ===
A referendum on independence for Southern Sudan was held from 9–15 January 2011. Preliminary results released by the Southern Sudan Referendum Commission on 30 January 2011 indicate that 98% of voters selected the "separation" option, with 1% selecting "unity". Southern Sudan became an independent country on 9 July 2011, a date set by the Comprehensive Peace Agreement. On 31 January 2011, Sudanese Vice-President Ali Osman Mohamed Taha stated the Sudanese Government's "acceptance" of the referendum results. On 23 January 2011, members of a steering committee on post-independence governing told reporters that upon independence the land would be named the Republic of South Sudan "out of familiarity and convenience." Other names considered were Azania, Jubanda, Nile Republic, Kush Republic and Juwama, a portmanteau for Juba, Wau and Malakal, three major cities.

== Government and politics ==
The Comprehensive Peace Agreement led to the promulgation of an Interim Constitution of Southern Sudan which established the autonomous Government of Southern Sudan headed by a President. The President was Head of Government and Commander-in-Chief of the Sudan People's Liberation Army. John Garang, the founder of the SPLA/M was the first President until his death on 30 July 2005. Salva Kiir, his deputy, was sworn in as First Vice President of Sudan and President of the Southern Sudan on 11 August 2005. Riek Machar replaced him as Vice-President. Legislative power is vested in the government and the unicameral Southern Sudan Legislative Assembly. The Constitution also provided for an independent judiciary, the highest organ being the Supreme Court.

=== Presidents and vice-presidents ===
Colour key (for political parties):
Sudan People's Liberation Movement

Presidents of Southern Sudan
Name	Portrait	Term of office		Political party
John Garang de Mabior		9 July 2005	30 July 2005	SPLM
Salva Kiir		30 July 2005	9 July 2011	SPLM

Vice presidents of Southern Sudan
Name	Portrait	Term of office		Political party	President
Salva Kiir		9 July 2005	30 July 2005	SPLM	John Garang de Mabior
Vacant		30 July 2005	11 August 2005		Salva Kiir
Riek Machar		11 August 2005	9 July 2011	SPLM	Salva Kiir

== States and counties ==
Darfur Eastern Front, area of operations July 2006 South Sudan Abyei (to hold referendum in 2011) South Kurdufan and Blue Nile (to hold "popular consultations" in 2011)

The Comprehensive Peace Agreement (CPA) granted the Government of Southern Sudan authority over the three historical provinces of (Bahr el Ghazal, Equatoria, and Upper Nile) which previously enjoyed autonomy as the Southern Sudan Autonomous Region between 1972 and 1983. It did not include Nuba Mountains, Abyei and Blue Nile. Abyei held a referendum on joining Southern Sudan or staying under Sudanese control, while Nuba Mountains (South Kurdufan as a whole) and Blue Nile were required to hold "popular consultations".

The autonomous government had authority over the following regions and States of Sudan:

Bahr el Ghazal

- Northern Bahr el Ghazal
- Western Bahr el Ghazal
- Lakes
- Warrap

Equatoria

- Western Equatoria
- Central Equatoria
- Eastern Equatoria

Greater Upper Nile

- Jonglei
- Unity
- Upper Nile

The ten states were further subdivided into 86 counties.

=== Abyei Area ===
Abyei is a region located on the border between southern Sudan and northern Sudan that is claimed by both sides. The region was to hold a referendum on joining the south or remaining part of the north at the same time as the southern independence referendum but this was postponed. As part of the Comprehensive Peace Agreement, an Abyei Area Administration was established on 31 August 2008.

== See also ==
- Republic of South Sudan, the independent state formed on 9 July 2011.
- Southern Sudan Autonomous Region (1972–1983), the autonomous region that existed between 1972 and 1983.
