= Assessment and Evaluation Commission =

Assessment and Evaluation Commission (AEC)
- مفوضية التقيم و التقدير
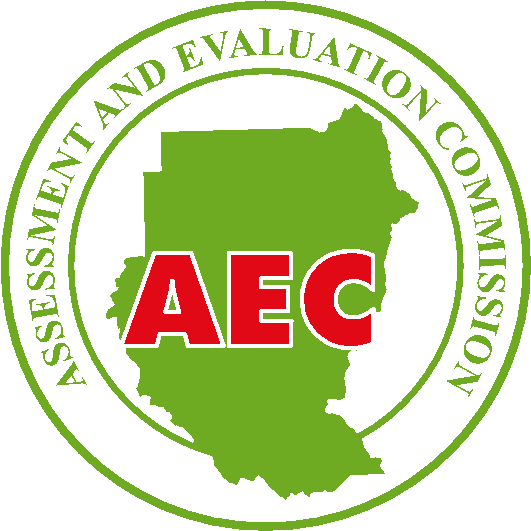
- Official logo of the AEC

Agency overview
- Formed: October 30, 2005
- Headquarters: Khartoum, Sudan
- Agency executive: Sir Derek Plumbly, Chairman
- Parent agency: Presidency of the Republic of the Sudan
- Website: www.aec-sudan.org

The Assessment and Evaluation Commission (AEC) is a commission in the Republic of the Sudan that monitors and supports the implementation of the Comprehensive Peace Agreement (CPA). The AEC was charged to conduct a mid-term evaluation of the unity arrangements established.

The members of the AEC are representatives from the Government of National Unity (three from the National Congress Party and three from the Sudan People's Liberation Movement); representatives from the Intergovernmental Authority on Development (IGAD) (Kenya and Ethiopia); and representatives from Italy, the Netherlands, Norway, the United Kingdom and the United States, that witnessed the peace negotiations leading to the creation of the CPA. The African Union, the Arab League, the European Union and the United Nations have observer status. Sir Derek Plumbly has served as the AEC's chairman since February 11, 2008.

In order to help the AEC perform its task, the CPA obligates the parties to the CPA (the NCP and the SPLM) to work with the AEC with a view to improving the institutions and arrangements created under the CPA and making the unity of Sudan attractive to the people of South Sudan. Also, the AEC can present reports to the Presidency of the Republic of Sudan (and publish them with the consent of the Presidency), advise the Presidency on the arrangements and institutions created under the CPA, form verification teams on any questions connected with the CPA, and evaluate the fulfillment of international commitments and support for CPA implementation, under the AEC Rules of Procedure.

The AEC holds monthly plenary sessions that are attended by representatives of the Parties, members of the working groups, and the Executive Secretariat. The AEC Chairperson submits his assessments and findings to the Office of the Presidency.

The AEC has been using its mandate by presenting a Mid Term Evaluation Report to the Presidency on July 8, 2008. Also, the active involvement of the AEC in the Abyei crisis, traveling to Abyei and providing an environment where the parties concerned could negotiate the Abyei Roadmap, proved to be an effective factor in support of the implementation of the CPA.

The AEC has offices in Khartoum and Juba.

== Legal status ==
The Assessment and Evaluation Commission (AEC) was established in accordance with the Comprehensive Peace Agreement (CPA). Article 2.4 of the Machakos Protocol calls for an Assessment and Evaluation Commission to be established to "monitor the implementation of the Peace Agreement". The exact composition, tasks and location of the AEC are determined by Republican Decree No. 36 of October 30, 2005.

== Structure ==
The AEC is structured into working groups and has an executive secretariat. There are four AEC working groups, each focusing on a protocol in the CPA:

- Power Sharing
- Wealth Sharing
- Security Arrangements
- Three Areas (Abyei, Southern Kordofan and Blue Nile)

These groups are chaired by members of the international community, and work in closed session on implementation issues with Commission members and technical experts. Monthly meetings frequently include special presentations and reports given by government ministries, commissions, and relevant authorities. Progress reports for each group are submitted to the Commission on a regular basis.

The Executive Secretariat functions as the logistical, operational, and administrative component of the AEC. Specialized units in General Services, Finance, Research, and IT Support are managed by the Executive Secretary as directed by the AEC chairman.
