= Akol Miyen Kuol =

South Sudanese poet (born 1974)

- Born: 1974 (age 51–52); Abyei
- Occupations: Journalist, author, poet
- Children: 3
- Writing career
- Language: English, Arabic, Dinka
- Years active: 2000 - present
- Website: akolmiyenkuol.com

Akol Miyen Kuol (born in 1974) is a South Sudanese journalist, author and poet. He was born in the oil-rich region of Abyei but currently lives in exile in Kenya. Akol Miyen is known for using poetry to promote peace in his homeland South Sudan. Akol currently works for the BBC as Sudan and South Sudan analyst. In 2016, the BBC threatened to fire Akol after the journalist expressed "disappointment over impediments" in the implementation of a peace deal between the South Sudanese government and rebels, telling warring parties in the country that an "agreement between South Sudanese and South Sudanese will never be a bad peace". An online campaign by Akol, called 'Save the Last Train', inspired artists in Juba to paint murals on walls across the capital to preach peace. Akol launched Save the Last Train campaign at SpiceTalks an initiative of Spice Without Borders in 2016.

== Early life ==
Akol fled Abyei in 1978 due to the political instability in the region and went to northern Sudan. He left Sudan in 1993 for Egypt as he did not want to join the Sudanese army because "the government was fighting my own people". Two and a half years later, he moved to Tanzania and then to Kenya in 1999. Akol says his love for his country and Africa inspired him to write poems and has dedicated a collection of poems to former South African President Nelson Mandela.

== Publications ==
1. "The Sun Will be Rising' (poem, 2001)

2. "The Last Train" (poem, 2003)

3. "A Case for the Capacity of South Sudanese to Rule Themselves" (analytical book, 2009)

4. "Sudan: Understanding the Oil-Rich Region of Abyei" (analytical book, 2011"

5. "The Obstacles of Creativity in South Sudan" (paper, 1997)

== Personal life ==
Akol is married and has three children.
