= TWIC =

TWIC or Twic may refer to:

- Transportation Worker Identification Credential
- The Week in Chess
- Twic State
- Twic County
- misspelling for Twice, a K-pop girl group.
