= Derek Plumbly =

British diplomat

Sir Derek Plumbly KCMG (born 15 May 1948) is a British diplomat who has served throughout the Arab world. From 2012 to 2015, he served as the UN Special Coordinator for Lebanon.

== Early life ==
Plumbly was born in the New Forest in Hampshire. He attended Brockenhurst Grammar School. He studied politics, philosophy and economics at Magdalen College, Oxford. After graduating, Plumbly signed up for Voluntary Service Overseas and taught for a year and a half in Sukkur in Pakistan's Sindh province.

He joined the Foreign and Commonwealth Office in 1972 and subsequently studied Arabic, first at the Middle East Centre for Arab Studies in Shemlan, Lebanon, where he lived with a local family for a year, and then at the University of Jordan.

== Career ==
Plumbly served in a variety of postings around the Middle East and elsewhere, including aa Ambassador to the Kingdom of Saudi Arabia and Ambassador to the Arab Republic of Egypt.

From February 2008 until the independence of South Sudan in July 2011 he headed the Assessment and Evaluation Commission which was charged with monitoring the implementation of the Comprehensive Peace Agreement in Sudan.

In 2011, he was appointed as the United Nations Special Coordinator for Lebanon (UNSCOL); he served in this position from 2012 to 2015.

Since 2015 he has chaired the Arab British Centre, standing down in 2023, and been a visiting professor at King’s College London. He is a Trustee of the British University in Egypt.

== Timeline of career ==
- United Nations Special Coordinator for Lebanon (2012-2015) https://unscol.unmissions.org/
- Chairman of the Assessment and Evaluation Commission (2008–2011) Assessment and Evaluation Commission
- Ambassador to Egypt (2003–2007)
- Ambassador to Saudi Arabia (2000–2003)
- FCO Director for the Middle East and North Africa (1997-2000)
- UK International Drugs Coordinator, FCO Director, Drugs and International Crime (1996-1997)
- Head of Chancery, UK Mission to the UN, New York (1992-1996)
- Deputy Head of Mission, Riyadh (1988-1992)
- First Secretary, Washington (1984-1988)
- FCO desk officer, Cyprus, then Saudi Arabia (1980-1984)
- First Secretary, Cairo (1977–1980)
- Second Secretary, Jeddah (1975–1977)

== Honours and awards ==
Plumbly was appointed a Companion of the Order of St Michael and St George (CMG) in the Gulf War Honours List in 1991 and Knight Commander (KCMG) in 2000

He was awarded an honorary doctorate by Loughborough University in 2008.

== Personal ==
He married Nadia Youssef Gohar in 1979. They have a daughter and two sons.

== See also ==
- Assessment and Evaluation Commission

== Notes ==
Diplomatic posts
Preceded by Sir Andrew Green	British Ambassador to Saudi Arabia; 2000–2003	Succeeded by Sir Sherard Cowper-Coles
Preceded by Sir John Sawers	British Ambassador to Egypt; 2003–2007	Succeeded by Dominic Asquith
