= Pierre-Marie Dupuy =

French jurist

Pierre-Marie Dupuy (born October 5, 1946 in Paris) is a French jurist. Since 1981, he has been a law professor at Panthéon-Assas University, where he has been on leave since 2000. From 2000 to 2008, he was Professor of International Law at the European University Institute in Florence. Since 2008, he has worked in the same capacity at the Graduate Institute of International and Development Studies in Geneva.

== Life ==
Pierre-Marie Dupuy was born in 1946 as the son of the international law expert René-Jean Dupuy and graduated from the Institut d'études politiques de Paris in 1969. He also acquired a diploma in public law at the University of Paris in the same year, and a year later in political science. In 1974, he earned a doctorate and passed the Agrégation, the competitive exam for professorship positions in France.

He then served as professor at the Universities of Strasbourg and Paris Val-de-Marne, and from 1981 at Paris-Panthéon-Assas University. Between 2000 and 2008, he held a professorship in international law at the European University Institute in Florence. Since 2008, he is Professor of International Law at the Geneva Graduate Institute of International and Development Studies. He has also appeared as a visiting professor at the University of Michigan, at the Universities of Tokyo and Kyoto, at the Complutense University of Madrid and LMU Munich. In the years 1984 and 2000, he taught each the General Course at the Hague Academy of International Law. Besides his current academic appointment at the Graduate Institute of International and Development Studies, Mr. Dupuy is a member of the International Arbitration Institute (IAI), a Global Agenda Council on the International Legal System for the World Economic Forum, a visiting faculty member of the Geneva Academy of International Humanitarian Law and Human Rights (ADH) as well as a faculty member of the Geneva Center for International Dispute Settlement.

Pierre-Marie Dupuy is a member of the Scientific Advisory Board of the journal Revue Générale de Droit International Public, and was a founding member of the European Journal of International Law. He is now a member of the Honorary Editorial Board of the journal. His Droit international public is "one of the best known French international law textbooks" according to the European Society of International Law.

In addition to his native country he worked as a counsel or representative for various states including Equatorial Guinea, Germany, Honduras, Hungary, Italy, Mali, Mexico, Portugal, Spain and Tunisia before the International Court of Justice in The Hague. He acted inter alia as consultant to the OECD, the United Nations Environment Programme, the Bureau International des Expositions, UNESCO and Eutelsat. He is also listed as notable Global-wide Arbitrator in the field of Public International Law by Chambers and Partners. He chairs and is a panel member in a number of International Centre for Settlement of Investment Disputes (ICSID) and International Chamber of Commerce (ICC) cases. One of his most notable positions in this field was his presidency over the tribunal in the Abyei Arbitration in front of the Permanent Court of Arbitration. The case concerned the determination of the boundaries of the Abyei area between North and South Sudan between The Government of Sudan and The Sudan People's Liberation Movement/Army.

In March 2003, Dupuy was one of the "eminent academic lawyers" who wrote opposing the 2003 invasion of Iraq.

Professor Pierre-Marie Dupuy is fluent in French, English, Spanish, Italian and German.

== International Litigation (excerpts) ==
=== International Court of Justice ===
- Represented the Republic of Tunisia as Adviser to the Government in the Case concerning the Continental Shelf (Tunisia v. Libyan Arab Jamahiriya), initiation of proceedings 1978, judgement 1982
- Represented the Republic of Mali as Co-Agent in the Case concerning the Frontier Dispute (Burkina Faso v. Republic of Mali, initiation of proceedings 1983, judgement 1986
- Represented the Republic of Honduras as Co-Agent in the Case concerning Land, Island and Maritime Frontier Dispute (El Salvador v. Honduras: Nicaragua intervening), initiation of proceedings 1986, judgement 1990
- Represented the Republic of Honduras as Co-Agent in the Case concerning Border And Transborder Armed Actions (Nicaragua v. Honduras), initiation of proceedings 1986, judgement 1988
- Represented the Portuguese Republic as Co-Agent, Counsel and Advocate in the Case concerning East Timor (Portugal v. Australia), initiation of proceedings 1991, judgement 1995
- Represented the Republic of Hungary as Co-Agent in the Case concerning the Gabčíkovo–Nagymaros Project (Hungary v. Slovakia), initiation of proceedings 1993, judgement 1997
- Represented the Republic of Equatorial Guinea as Advisor in the Case concerning the Land and Maritime Boundary Between Cameroon and Nigeria (Cameroon v. Nigeria: Equatorial Guinea intervening), initiation of proceedings 1994, judgement 2002
- Represented the Kingdom of Spain as Agent (from 1 November 1998) in the Fisheries Jurisdiction Case (Spain v. Canada), initiation of proceedings 1995, judgement 1998
- Represented France during the Request For An Examination of the Situation in Accordance with Paragraph 63 of the Court's Judgement of 20 December 1974 in the Nuclear Tests Case (New Zealand v. France), 1995
- Represented the Federal Republic of Germany as Co-Agent and Counsel in the LaGrand Case (Germany v. United States of America), initiation of proceedings 1999, judgement 2001
- Represented the Republic of Honduras as Co-Agent in the Case concerning Territorial and Maritime Dispute Between Nicaragua and Honduras in the Caribbean Sea (Nicaragua v. Honduras), initiation of proceedings 1999, judgement 2007
- Represented the Federal Republic of Germany as Agent in the Case concerning Certain Property (Liechtenstein v. Germany), initiation of proceedings 2001, judgement 2005
- Represented the Republic of Honduras as Co-Agent in the Application For Revision Of The Judgement of 11 September 1992 in the Case concerning The Land, Island and Maritime Frontier Dispute (El Salvador v. Honduras: Nicaragua intervening), 2002–2003
- Represented the United Mexican States as Agent (from 17 March 2004) in the Case concerning Avena and Other Mexican Nationals (Mexico v. United States of America), initiation of proceedings 2003, judgment 2004
- Representing Italy in the Case concerning Jurisdictional Immunities of the State (Germany v. Italy: Greece intervening), initiation of proceedings 2008, judgment 2012

=== International Centre for Settlement of Investment Disputes ===
- Arbitrator in the Case Noble Ventures, Inc. v. Romania (ICSID Case No. ARB/01/11)
- Presiding Arbitrator in the Case CIT Group Inc. v. Argentine Republic (ICSID Case No. ARB/04/9)
- Arbitrator in the Case I&I Beheer B.V. v. Bolivarian Republic of Venezuela (ICSID Case No. ARB/05/4)
- Presiding Arbitrator in the Case AES Corporation v. Argentine Republic (ICSID Case No. ARB/02/17)
- Presiding Arbitrator in the Case Daimler Financial Services AG v. Argentine Republic (ICSID Case No. ARB/05/1)
- Arbitrator in the Case Gold Reserve Inc. v. Bolivarian Republic of Venezuela (ICSID Case No. ARB(AF)/09/1)

=== Permanent Court of Arbitration ===
- Presiding Arbitrator in the Abyei Arbitration (The Government of Sudan / The Sudan People's Liberation Movement/Army)

== Books (excerpt) ==
- La responsabilité internationale des États pour les dommages d'origine technologique et industrielle Paris 1976
- Le fait générateur de la responsabilité internationale des états. Publication of the Recueil des Cours. Volume 188. Dordrecht and Boston 1986
- L'unité de l'ordre juridique international. Publication of the Recueil des Cours. Volume 297. The Hague 2002
- Droit international et droit interne dans la jurisprudence comparée du Conseil constitutionnel et du Conseil d'Etat Paris 2001 (Editor)
- Obligations multilatérales, droit impératif et responsabilité internationale des états : Colloque international de Florence, 7 et 8 décembre 2001 European University Institute, Florence 2003 (Editor)
- NGOs in International Law: Efficiency in Flexibility? (ISBN 1847205607) Cheltenham and Northampton 2008 (Co-Editor)
- Droit international public. (ISBN 2247088937) Paris 1992, 1993, 1995, 1998, 2000, 2002, 2004, 2006, 2008, 2010
- Les grands textes de droit international public. (ISBN 2247088082) 1996, 2000, 2002, 2004, 2006, 2008, 2010
- Human Rights in International Investment Law and Arbitration. (ISBN 0199578192) Oxford and New York 2009 (Co-Editor)
