= UN Peacemaker =

UN Peacemaker is a United Nations (UN) website for distributing information related to peace processes. The website, managed by the UN Department of Political Affairs (DPA), provides an interface to a database of peace agreements, guidance material and information on UN mediation support services.

== Purpose ==
UN Peacemaker is an online mediation support tool for peacemaking professionals. Its target users include the UN Secretary-General and his or her Special Representatives involved in peace process mediation for trying to resolve international and internal armed conflicts, and UN partners active in peacemaking, including member states, regional organisations, civil society, non-governmental organizations and national mediators.

== Content ==
UN Peacemaker offers tools and resources to support mediators and their teams in managing peace processes and negotiating peace agreements, including:

- a database of more than 750 peace agreements;
- guidance documents on mediation;
- information on UN mediation support activities and services;
- a library of selected literature on key mediation issues (power-sharing, wealth-sharing, constitutional issues, mediation processes and strategies)
- the UN Mediation app for mobile phones, which contains a library of key UN guidance products for mediators and mediation support actors.

Plans for the website include the distribution of video interviews with mediation experts discussing strategies and tactics on how to manage mediation processes and providing guidance on specific themes.

== Background ==
Initially launched in 2006, UN Peacemaker is the product of a multi-year learning project drawing on the UN Department of Political Affairs' (DPA) leadership and experience in peacemaking and preventive diplomacy. To keep pace with evolving demands and changes, the website has been overhauled and re-launched within the UN system in 2012 and was made available to the public in early 2013.

UN Peacemaker has become a point of reference among practitioners and academics alike. In 2008, UN Peacemaker was announced as a winner of the 'UN 21 Award' in the category of "knowledge management" projects. It is also one of the most comprehensive databases of peace agreements with an advanced search functions.
