= Kuol Deim Kuol =

South Sudanese general and administrator

Chief Administrator of the Abyei Area
- In office 29 June 2020 – 19 January 2023
- Preceded by: Kuol Alor Kuol

Personal details
- Citizenship: South Sudan
- Party: SPLM

Military service
- Commands: Lieutenant general in the SPLA

Kuol D. Kuol is a former South Sudan People's Defence Forces (SPLA) general, who served as chief administrator of the Abyei Area between 29 June 2020 and 19 January 2023.

Kuol is a Ngok Dinka from Abyei. In 2012, Kuol was a lieutenant general in the SPLA, the army of South Sudan. On March 14, 2012, Kuol was put in charge of Operation Restore Peace, a disarmament program in Jonglei State. The disarmament program aimed to end intercommunal violence, however, it was resisted by the Nuer White Army, who clashed several times with the army. During the Heglig Crisis, Kuol was in favor of fighting the Sudanese Armed Forces if talks could not resolve the border dispute. Kuol was removed from active service in the SPLA and placed in reserve in January 2013. On December 18, 2018, President Salva Kiir appointed Kuol as the principal of the SPLM political school, although it was unclear what the role of principal would entail. On June 29, 2020, Kiir appointed Kuol as the chief administrator of the Abyei Area, a region disputed with Sudan, succeeding Kuol Alor Kuol.
