= Agok =

Village in South Sudan

Agok Arabic: أكوك
- Border Town
- Location in the Sudan and South Sudan Agok (South Sudan)
- Coordinates: 9°20′58″N 28°34′50″E
- Country: South Sudan; Sudan
- Administrative area: Rumamer County, Abyei Special Administrative Area

Population
  - Total: 30,000 (23,000 IDP)
- Time zone: UTC+2 (EAT)
- Area code: 6GXC8HXJ+Q5

Agok (Arabic: أكوك) is a border town in the disputed Abyei region near the South Sudanese border. Due to the Second Sudanese Civil War (2007-2011), many residents in South Sudan fled to Agok, with 23,000 of the 30,000 total people in the town being internally displaced. After the war, internal conflicts in Sudan caused tensions between pro-Sudanese and pro-South Sudanese residents, which caused a humanitarian crisis in Agok. UNISFA established its base in Agok.

On 10 February 2022, armed militants from Twic County raided Agok Town and Aniet Market, with ten civilians killed. The militants were suspected to be from South Sudan according to Abyei Youth chairperson, Chol Deng Miyom. A similar attack in January 2024 left a UN peacekeeper dead along with dozens of others.
