= Comprehensive Peace Agreement =

2005 agreement which ended the Second Sudanese Civil War

- Type: Peace agreement
- Signed: 9 January 2005
- Location: Naivasha, Kenya
- Mediators: Intergovernmental Authority on Development; United States; United Kingdom; Norway
- Parties: Government of Sudan; Sudan People's Liberation Movement

North Sudan Darfur Eastern Front, area of operations July 2006 South Sudan (held referendum in 2011) Abyei (scheduled in CPA to hold referendum in 2011, postponed indefinitely as of May 2011) States to hold "popular consultations" in 2011: South Kurdufan (process suspended) and Blue Nile (status unclear)

The Comprehensive Peace Agreement (CPA, Arabic: اتفاقية السلام الشامل, romanized: Ittifāqiyyah al-salām al-šāmil), also known as the Naivasha Agreement, was an accord signed on 9 January 2005, by the Sudan People's Liberation Movement (SPLM) and the Government of Sudan. The CPA was meant to end the Second Sudanese Civil War, develop democratic governance countrywide, and share oil revenues. It also set a timetable for a Southern Sudanese independence referendum.

The peace process was encouraged by the Intergovernmental Authority on Development (IGAD), in addition to a "troika" of donor countries comprising the United States, United Kingdom, and Norway.

== Provisions ==
- The south will have autonomy for six years, followed by a referendum on secession.
- Both sides to the conflict will merge their armed forces into a 39,000-strong force after six years, if the secession referendum results in a vote for unity.
- Income from oilfields will be shared evenly between north and south.
- Jobs will be split according to varying ratios (central administration: 70 to 30, Abyei/Blue Nile State/Nuba Mountains: 55 to 45, both in favour of the government).
- Islamic law is to remain in the north, while continued use of the Sharia in the south is to be decided by the elected assembly.

== Components ==
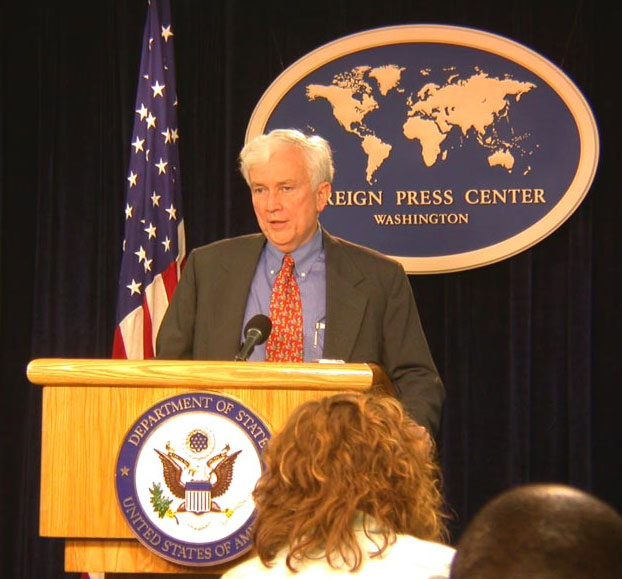
U.S. Senior Representative on Sudan Charles R. Snyder briefs foreign press on the CPA in Washington, D.C., on 12 January

The process resulted in the following agreements (also referred to as protocols):

- The Machakos Protocol (or Chapter I), signed in Machakos, Kenya on 20 July 2002. Agreement on broad principles of government and governance.
- The Protocol on Power Sharing (or Chapter II), signed in Naivasha, Kenya on 26 May 2004
- The Agreement on Wealth Sharing (or Chapter III), signed in Naivasha, Kenya on 7 January 2004
- The Protocol on the Resolution of the Conflict in Abyei Area (or Chapter IV), signed in Naivasha, Kenya on 26 May 2004
- The Protocol on the Resolution of the Conflict in Southern Kordofan and Blue Nile States (or Chapter V), signed in Naivasha, Kenya on 26 May 2004
- The Agreement on Security Arrangements (or Chapter VI), signed in Naivasha, Kenya on 25 September 2003
- The Permanent Ceasefire and Security Arrangements Implementation Modalities and Appendices (or Annexure I), signed in Naivasha, Kenya on 30 October 2004
- The Implementation Modalities and Global Implementation Matrix and Appendices (or Annexure II), signed in Naivasha, Kenya, on 31 December 2004

The final, comprehensive agreement was signed on 9 January 2005 and marked the commencement of implementation activities.

== Implementation ==
=== 2007 Southern withdrawal ===
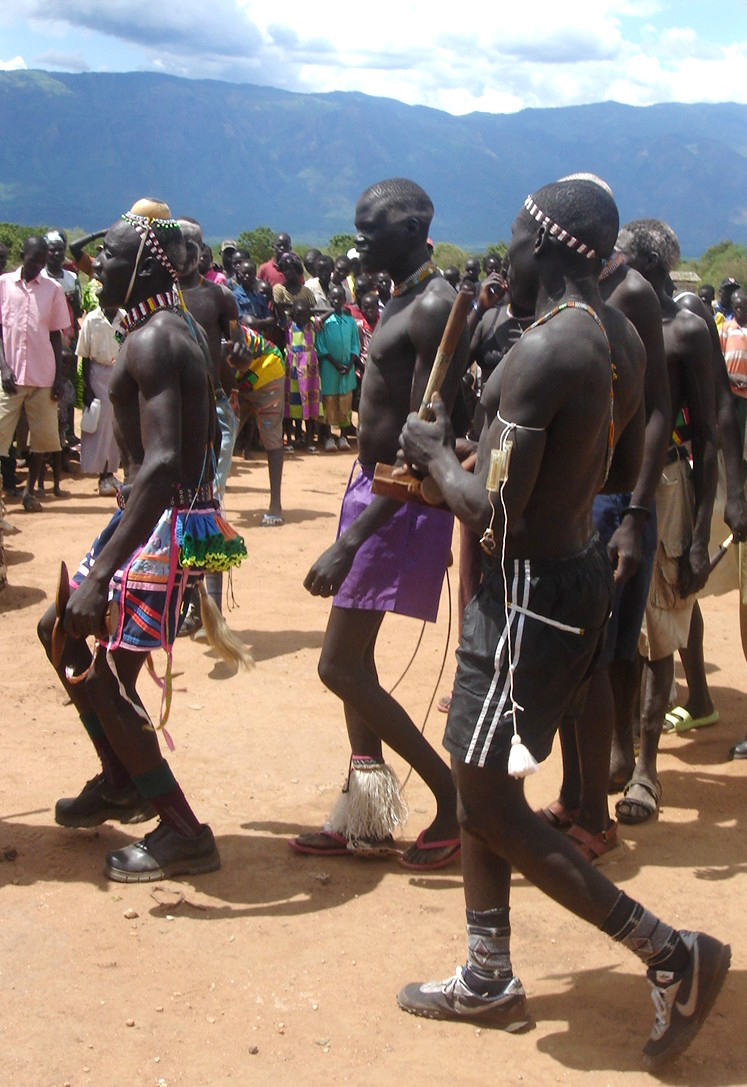
Dancers in Kapoeta at an awareness building rally for the peace agreement, 2006

On 11 October 2007, the SPLM withdrew from the government of national unity (GoNU), accusing the central government of violating the terms of the CPA. In particular, the SPLM states that the Khartoum-based government, which is dominated by the National Congress Party, has failed to withdraw over 15,000 troops from southern oilfields and failed to implement the Protocol on Abyei. The SPLM stated that it was not returning to war, while analysts noted that the agreement had been disintegrating for some time, notably because of international focus on the conflict in nearby Darfur.

The SPLM announced that it was rejoining the government on 13 December 2007, following an agreement. The agreement states that the seat of government will rotate between Juba and Khartoum every three months, though it appears that this will be largely symbolic, as well as funding for a census (vital for the referendum) and a timetable for the withdrawal of troops across the border.

Northern Sudanese troops finally left Southern Sudan on 8 January 2008.

=== South Sudan Independence ===
A referendum was held from 9 to 15 January 2011 to determine if South Sudan should declare its independence from Sudan, with 98.83% of the population voting for independence. It became independent as the Republic of South Sudan on 9 July 2011.

=== Popular Consultations ===
Popular consultations for Blue Nile and South Kordofan were suspended as part of the ongoing conflict in those regions between the northern wing of the SPLA and the Justice and Equality Movement against the central government.

== See also ==
- 2011 South Sudanese independence referendum
- Assessment and Evaluation Commission
- Sudanese conflict in South Kordofan and Blue Nile
- Darfur Peace Agreement
- UN Peacemaker
