= Abyei status referendum =

Delayed 2011 referendum in condominium

The Abyei status referendum is a delayed referendum that was originally due to be held in 2011 in which the residents of Abyei would decide either to remain part of the Sudanese South Kordofan region or to become part of the Bahr el Ghazal region of South Sudan.

Although an unofficial referendum was held in 2013, as of October 2026 no official referendum has been held.

== History ==
The referendum was originally planned to be held simultaneously to the 2011 South Sudanese independence referendum on January 9–15, 2011, but was postponed indefinitely due to disagreements over the process. Due to the uncertainty, violence erupted in which more than 30 people were killed. As a response the UN deployed extra troops to its UNMIS contingent. The impasse on the referendum is due to lack of agreement on who constitutes a "resident of Abyei". The question is whether to include the Messiria tribe, who have historically stayed in the region every year for six months.

On 24 October 2012, the African Union proposal was to hold a referendum in October 2013, in accordance with the endorsement from the African Union Peace and Security Council following a mediation team led by former South African President Thabo Mbeki that included the exclusion of the Messiria, until Sudan rejected the offer saying it was sovereign over the region and that such a demarche would threaten the entire conflict resolution process. It also offered a six-week delay, until 9 December, to agree to the terms of a referendum between Sudan and South Sudan. Sudanese Foreign Minister Ali Karti said that he had confidence that the AU would accord both states more time to resolve difference over organising the referendum. He told the Sudanese parliament, in particular MPs from South Kordofan, that the AU proposal "will not ever see the light of day" and it will not be referred to the United Nations Security Council as the United States of America wants."

=== Informal vote ===
Between 27 and 29 October 2013 an informal, non-binding vote was held, although unrecognised by either Sudan or South Sudan. Only the Ngok Dinka tribe participated, with the Arab Misseriya tribe boycotting, claiming it would not recognise the result. The vote followed UN and AU warnings that such a move could inflame tensions. As counting took place, the Misseriya vowed to carry out its own such referendum. The spokesman for the Abyei Referendum High Committee, Luka Biong, announced that of those who voted, 99.9% supported joining South Sudan; this was then followed by celebrations.

The head of the African Union, Nkosazana Dlamini-Zuma, said the vote was illegal and its organisers risked sparking a return to war. "They pose a threat to peace in the Abyei area, and have the potential to trigger an unprecedented escalation on the ground... with far-reaching consequences for the region as a whole." An independent observer, Tim Flatman, said that 63,433 of 64,775 registered voters took part in the referendum and that only 12 voted to be part of Sudan, while there were 362 spoiled ballots. Flatman also suggested initial observations suggested a "very transparent process."

Choice	Votes	%
South Sudan	63,059	99.98
Sudan	12	0.02
Total	63,071	100.00
Valid votes	63,071	99.43
Invalid/blank votes	362	0.57
Total votes	63,433	100.00
Registered voters/turnout	64,775	97.93
Source: Al Jazeera

=== Since 2013 ===
In 2011 a special United Nations Interim Security Force for Abyei (UNISFA) was installed to prevent violence, and has periodically been extended. However in 2024 one of the UN peacekeepers was killed when their base in Agok was attacked.

As of March 2025 no referendum has been held, and distrust between the Ngok Dinka and the Misseriya remains.
