= Twic County =

South Sudanese administrative area

Twic County (Twic Mayardit)
- County
- Nickname: Wun Bol Nyuol
- Location in South Sudan
- Country: South Sudan
- Region: Bahr el Ghazal
- State: Warrap State

Area
  - Total: 1,528 sq mi (3,957 km^{2})

Population (2008 census)
  - Total: 204,905
  - Density: 134.1/sq mi (51.78/km^{2})
- Time zone: UTC+2 (CAT)

Twic County is a county located in Warrap State, in the Bahr el Ghazal region of South Sudan.

== History ==
Twic is also known as Twic Mayardit. Twic community played an important role in the liberation of South Sudan. Kerubino Kuanyin Bol was one of the founders of SPLM/SPLA (now Sudan People's Liberation Movement and South Sudan People's Defence Forces). Bol fired the first rebellious shot when the imposition of Islamic Sharia law in September 1983 triggered a second round of civil warfare in the undeveloped, largely animist and Christian southern regions of the Republic of Sudan.

The main livelihood of the population of Twic County is farming, livestock rearing, and fishing. There is also a commercial trade.

According to the 2008 census, the total population of Twic was 204,905 in 2008.

Warrap State's counties

Twic County comprises six Payams including Akoc, Ajak Kuac, Aweng, Pan-Nyok, Turalei, and Wunrok. The County administration is located in Turalei Payam.

== Notable people ==
- Kerubino Kuanyin Bol, SPLM/A founder and general
- Dominic Dim Deng, military veteran general and was the first defence minister
- Bona Malwal, journalist and politician
- Manute Bol, former NBA player
- Kuol Gai Owek Ajak, general labourer and victim of the Islamic State
