= 2011 South Sudanese independence referendum =

- 9 – 15 January 2011
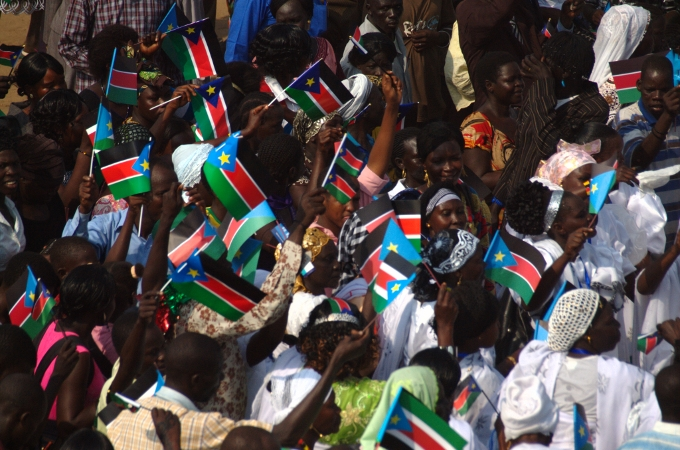
- People celebrating the independence of South Sudan on 9 July 2011

Results
Choice	Votes	%
Secession	3,792,518	98.83%
Unity	44,888	1.17%
Valid votes	3,837,406	99.62%
Invalid or blank votes	14,588	0.38%
Total votes	3,851,994	100.00%
Registered voters/turnout	3,947,676	97.58%
- Results by region

A referendum took place in Southern Sudan from 9 to 15 January 2011, on whether the region should remain a part of Sudan or become independent. The referendum was one of the consequences of the 2005 Naivasha Agreement between the Khartoum central government and the Sudan People's Liberation Army/Movement (SPLA/M).

A simultaneous referendum was supposed to be held in Abyei on whether to become part of South Sudan but it was postponed due to conflict over demarcation and residency rights.

On 7 February 2011, the referendum commission published the final results, with a landslide majority of 98.83% voting in favour of independence. While the ballots were suspended in 10 of the 79 counties for exceeding 100% of the voter turnout, the number of votes was still well over the requirement of 60% turnout, and the majority vote for secession is not in question.

The predetermined date for the creation of an independent state was 9 July 2011.

== Background ==
The prerequisites for the referendum included a census, which was used to define how wealth and political power will be apportioned between regions. The census was the basis of a voter registration process, which was also used for the national elections in 2010, which in turn set the stage for the referendum. The census was delayed three times. Problems included disagreements between the north and south over what they were obliged to do by the Naivasha Agreement, funding difficulties and an enormous logistical challenge. In the south, unmapped minefields from the war continued to make movement difficult, while up to 5,000,000 Sudanese were nomadic. Up to 2,000,000 internally displaced persons from the south remained in camps around Khartoum, in the centre of the country, whilst refugees remained in Uganda and Kenya. A further complication resulted from the conflict in Darfur to the west, where civilians who had fled attacks refused to take part in census out of fear that the government would use the results against them. Darfuri rebel groups were unanimous in their denunciation of the planned census, while the Justice and Equality Movement group had threatened to attack any census-taker.

There were disagreements between the National Congress Party (NCP) and the SPLA/M about what proportion of voters will have to be in favour of independence (the NCP wanted at least 75% support required), whether Southern Sudanese living in the north should be allowed to vote, and the post-referendum separation process (including the division of the national debt). Modest progress was made in early September 2010, but disagreements on fundamental points remained.

It is envisaged that "popular consultations" in South Kordofan and Blue Nile, without a clear reference to referendums and/or independence, would raise concerns about the future of these regions.

According to the terms of the Comprehensive Peace Agreement (or CPA), in October 2009, the central government of Sudan and the South Sudanese government agreed that turnout would have to be at least 60% of 3,800,000 voters would be necessary to validate. In this case, a simple majority vote in favour of independence would result in secession for South Sudan; should the turnout be insufficient in the first referendum, a second one will be held within sixty days.

== Campaign ==
The flag of the Government of Southern Sudan

Sudan proper Darfur Eastern Front, area of operations July 2006 South Sudan (held referendum in 2011) Abyei (referendum for 2011 postponed indefinitely) States to hold "popular consultations" in 2011: South Kurdufan (process suspended) and Blue Nile (postponed indefinitely)

Sudanese officials have said throughout campaigning that, regardless of their pro-unity or pro-separatist stance, the ultimate aim was a peaceful transition. Vice President Kiir acknowledged his administration had failed to deliver "the dividends of peace", and noted that a campaign to confiscate arms was a solution to maintaining stability.

Sudan's President Omar al-Bashir said that the southern region had a right to choose to secede and that the referendum was helpful because unity "could not be forced by power." He also said he would respect the outcome of the vote and support the south. However, he also said that though secession was a right it may not resolve issues for the south: "The stability of the south is very important to us because any instability in the south will have an impact on the north. If there is a war in your neighbour's house, you will not be at peace. The south suffers from many problems. It's been at war since 1959. The south does not have the ability to provide for its citizens or create a state or authority."

Negotiations continue between the ruling parties in the north and south on potential post-referendum arrangements—looking at future issues such as citizenship, security, finance and wealth sharing. Minister of Petroleum Mr. Deng said he fears that an immediate budget cut for the north would ignite a war. "In order to avoid conflict, we could look to a phase-out arrangement whereby you provide the north some [oil] until they get an alternative". The pipeline to export southern oil currently cuts through the north, and the south has not begun construction on a pipeline that would avoid that route. In an article published by The Washington Post on 21 September 2010, Deng noted that an interim agreement could help both north and south and result in a "win-win". The northern government said it would assume most of the country's $38,000,000,000 debt if secession was voted upon.

National campaigns were being held by both parties to address issues of potential clashes ahead of the referendum. President Al-Bashir wanted to reassure and assuage tension surrounding the issue of citizenship rights in the case of South Sudan secession. He said that even if southerners opted for secession, "the sentimental unity and social relations between north and south Sudan will remain standing." Al-Bashir vowed that the rights of southern citizens staying in the north after secession would be safeguarded, saying that his party would not allow anyone to infringe on the rights of southerners in the north, their properties, freedoms and residence regardless of citizenship.

The northern Justice and Peace Forum Party advocated separation of the country citing unity as a "bad forced marriage." Its chairman Al Taieb Mustafa said that the prospective support for the referendum would be "the real independence day for Sudan."

On 8 January, the mood in Juba, the southern capital, and the wider region was said to be jubilant with final pro-secession rallies celebrating independence in advance.

=== Egyptian and Libyan involvement ===
Early during the referendum process, an Egyptian proposal was made to have a confederation between the north and south of the country. However, President Omar al-Bashir said it was not being considered because the issue of the referendum was about "unity or separation. Our brothers in the south are refusing at the moment the proposal of confederation. If the separation was the result of the referendum, the two sides are going to negotiate over the future of relations between them."

Egyptian President Hosni Mubarak and Libyan leader Muammar Gaddafi later went to Sudan to try to assuage the conflict, though both men had previously called for the country to stay united. Egypt's Foreign Minister Ahmed Aboul Gheit said the meeting sought to ensure the referendum could be held in a "climate of freedom, transparency, and credibility, reflecting the will of the sons of the south" and also that both the South and North could strengthen bonds.

== Issues ==
Observers and key players feared violence ahead of the South Sudan referendum for a variety of reasons.

=== Abyei ===
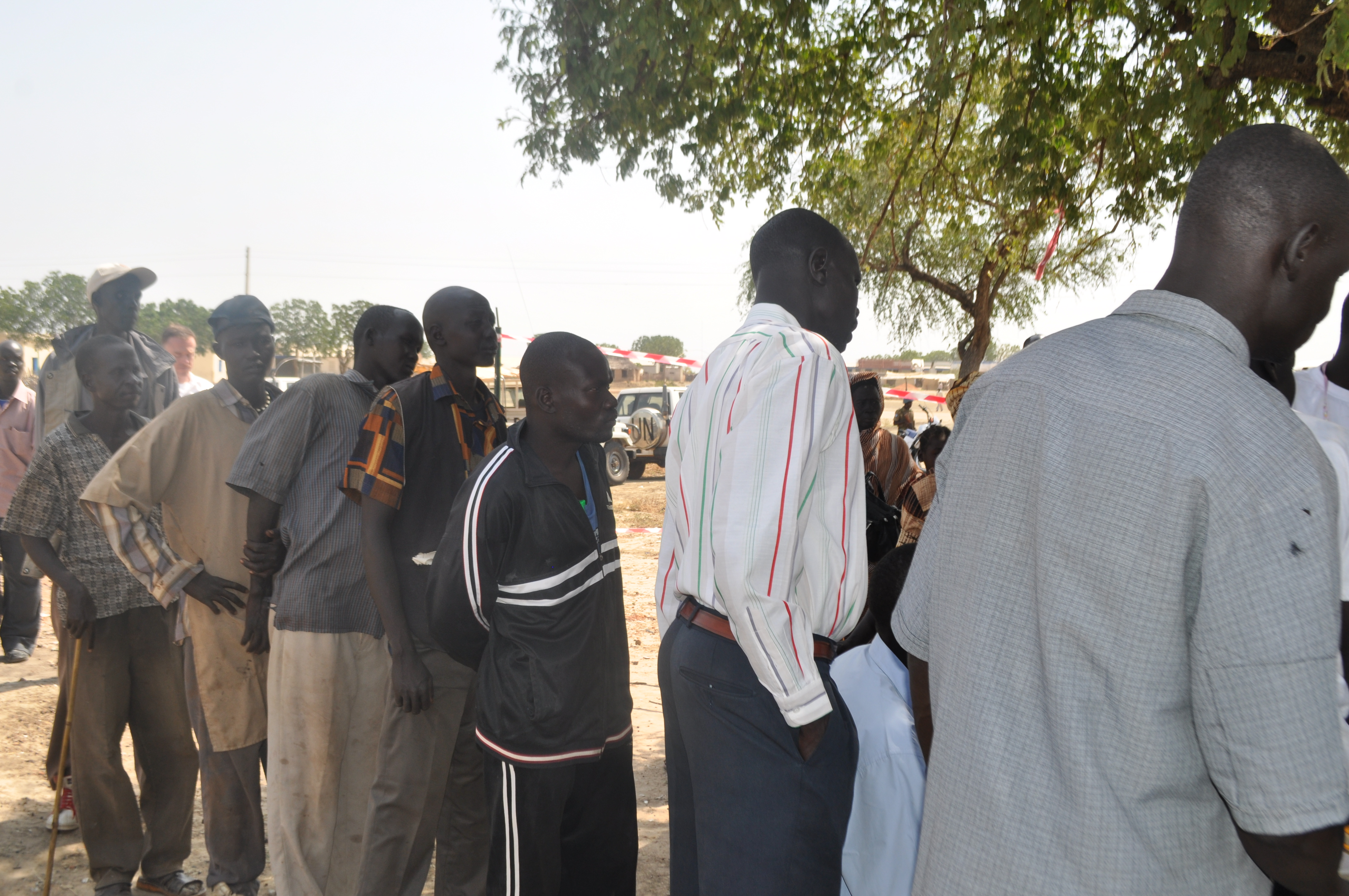
Line for voter registration in Abyei, 2009

Talks on resolving the status and of the eligibility criteria for voters in the disputed Abyei region broke down in October 2010, although both the central ruling NCP and southern SPLM said their respective teams "will meet again in Ethiopia toward the end of October to continue their discussions. The parties continue to commit themselves to their mutual goal of avoiding a return to conflict."

Didiri Mohammad Ahmad, an NCP official, said it was "not possible" to hold the referendum on the future of Abyei on time, and it could be delayed for months or be settled without a vote. He added that "We agreed that in the next talks we will try to look for other alternatives."

Sudan's Defense Minister, Abdel Rahim Mohammed Hussein, suggested the vote may have to be postponed. "According to the reality on the ground...border issues and Abyei must be resolved within the framework of one nation because doing so in the framework of two countries open[s] the door for foreign interference. The referendum is not a goal but a tool to consolidate and promote security and stability. This [UDI] is illegal and will not be recognized by the African Union or the other [organizations] because it would contradict the peace agreement and its procedures." Sudan's UN ambassador Daffa-Alla Elhag Ali Osman told the Security Council that "It is evident that any attempt to conduct the plebiscite before achieving an acceptable settlement between the two parties [in Abyei] will mean only a return to war." The United States said it was working to avoid the "danger" that would follow the failure to hold the referendum.

The government Sudan asked the UN for the printing of ballots for the referendum as diplomats and the electoral commission warned of any further delay would miss the deadline to hold the election.

Abyei was not finalized for the vote.

Bishtina Mohammed El Salam of the Misseriya, who dominate the region along with the Dinka tribe, said he would not accept Abyei's seceding and joining the south even though the latter favored secession. "If the Dinka take this decision – to annex Abyei to the south – there will be an immediate war without any excuse. We think they should be reasonable and think about it. They should know that those who are pushing them to take that decision will not give them any back-up."

=== South Kurdufan and Blue Nile ===
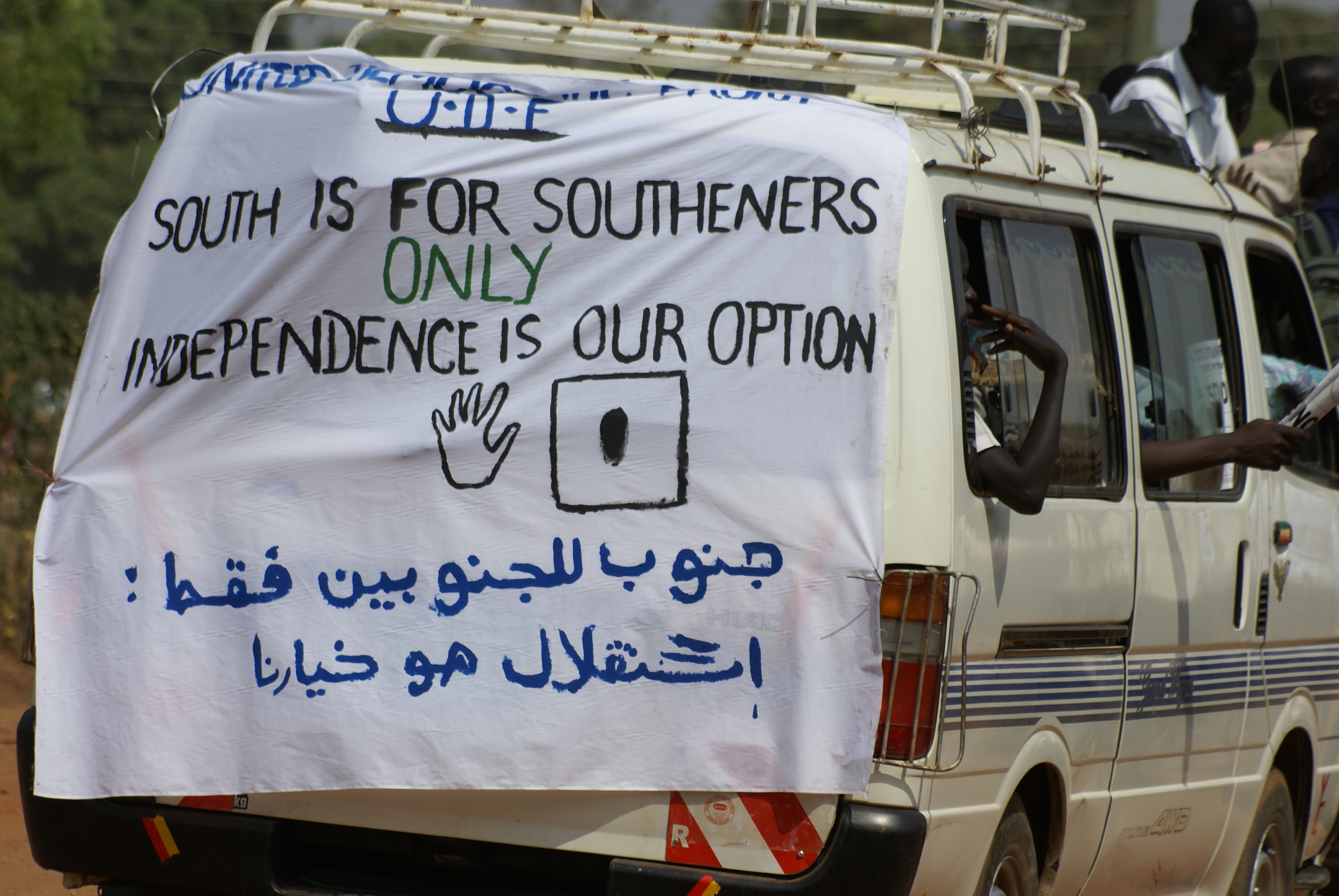
"South is for southerners" – tensions from the civil war were a factor in the vote.

The status of the Nuba Mountains region of South Kurdufan and Blue Nile is more complex as ethnic data is less clear.

In the Blue Nile, African ethnic groups such as the Berta, Anuak and Koma are dominant in the South. The Northern part, however, has an Arab majority, although the enclave of Ingessana in Tabi Hills is mostly Animist and was targeted by the northern forces during the civil war. The total population stands at 832,112 according to the Election Commission. During the 2010 provincial elections, the NCP won 29 out of the 48 seats, while the SPLM won 17 seats. In the National Assembly elections, the NCP won 6 out of the 10 seats, while the SPLM got 4. However, the SPLM accused the NCP of fraud. The separate gubernatorial election was won by the SPLM candidate, who polled almost 5% votes more than his NCP rival.

The Nuba Mountain was home to some 1,000,000 ethnic Nuba during 1980. A total of 99 different tribes used to live in this region. When the civil war broke out during the late 1980s, the Nuba aligned with the SPLA. The vast majority of Nuba were taken as prisoners of war and forcibly relocated to camps in North Kordofan and Khartoum. When the fighting ended, only about half the population survived. The rest either surrendered and moved north or were killed during the fighting. After the signing of the peace accord, some of the Nuba returned to the mountains, but the tribal elders refused to re-admit them into the tribes as they feared the abductees (mostly young men) were too Islamised. They were finally allowed back into the tribal fold after a 6-month re-education camp.

The SPLA controls four counties in Southern Kordofan: Lagawa, Kadugli, Rashad and Dilling. In 2005, the Arab dominated West Kordofan was merged in to South Kordofan, resulting in Arabs gaining a majority in the new province.

The 2008 census reported the total population of South Kordofan at 1,406,404 (though the SPLA claims many ethnic Nuba living in remote regions were not counted). This figure includes the Abyei region and it is not known how many are Nuba, Ngok and Baggara. During the 2010 National Assembly election, the NCP won 13 out of the 17 seats, while the SPLM won 4 seats. The gubernatorial elections were postponed to 2011.

During the 2010 Presidential elections, the NCP received 69.3% of the votes in South Kordofan and 56.6% in the Blue Nile, while the SPLM received 18.5% of the votes in South Kordofan and 32.7% in the Blue Nile.

Ahmed Harun of NCP defeated Abdelaziz al-Hilu of the SPLM in the 2011 South Kordofan Gubernatorial elections. Harun received 201,455 votes compared to Hilu's 194,955 votes. NCP won 33 seats in the legislature to SPLM's 22 seats. SPLM refused to acknowledge the results, accusing the NCP of voter intimidation and electoral fraud.

=== Religion and tribes ===
Religion was also expected to significantly influence the referendum. Christian commentators have noted that there is a "climate of chronic discrimination against Sudanese Christians and other minorities." For some, religion was not the issue, while other southerners objected to alleged "Islamisation." Some Southern Sudanese had also claimed that tribalism and racism affected their choice. South Sudanese Muslims supported secession.

President Omar al-Bashir said dual citizenship would not be allowed. According to the CPA, 20 percent of civil service jobs were reserved for southerners, which would then be lost if the country splits.

Questions were also asked about the status of tribes such as the Nuba and Misseriya of South Kordofan that inhabit the border regions with South Sudan.

== Polls ==
When questioned in a poll prior to the official referendum, 97% of South Sudanese people said that they would be voting for independence.

An early poll of 1,400 individuals was carried out by a coalition of civil society organisations in Southern Sudan prior to the January referendum, indicating that 97% of voters would likely vote for secession. According to John Andruga, chairman of the coalition, 100% of respondents in the states of Unity and Eastern Equatoria would vote for secession. A similar survey carried out one year prior by the US-based National Democratic Institute had indicated that 90% of voters would vote for secession.

== Controversies ==
Authorities in both the north and south of Sudan have been accused of harassment and intimidation against the media in order to avoid dissenting coverage. Rights groups warned the media could be slapped with further restrictions.

The Youth and Sports Minister, Haj Majid Suwar, of the National Congress Party (NCP) suggested the government "may not recognise the results" and would "talk to ... the USA and the UN and the AU and say that the Sudan People's Liberation Movement didn't fulfill the CPA Comprehensive Peace Agreement" by allowing open campaigning and the withdrawal of their soldiers from southern areas. He also said that the potential borders between them would have to be drawn up pending redeployment of the SPLM's forces to the 1956 border.

Salva Kiir, the president of the southern region and the first vice president of Sudan, said that the referendum's timing was important as there was "a risk of a return to war in case of delay or denial of this exercise, and it would be on a very massive scale." Kuol Deim Kuol, the spokesman for the SPLM's military, accused the NCP of "just looking for a pretext of starting a war" and called Suwar a "war monger."

Sudan's president, Omar Hassan al-Bashir, accused the SPLM of breaching the terms of the peace deal and warned of a return to conflict if the disputes were not settled before the referendum. Despite that, he said he was committed to holding the referendum, but insisted on settling differences over the shared border and how to share the oil, debt and Nile river water.

The NCP accused the SPLM of discouraging southerners who were living in the north of the country from registering, as the SPLM threatened not to recognize the referendum if its demands were not met. Southerners in the North were reluctant to vote because of fears of being uprooted from their homes. Muslims in the border provinces of the South also expressed fear of a campaign of violence that could be unleashed as a consequence of the referendum. Many feared a return to civil war, should the referendum fail because of the increasingly heated rhetoric. Along with Chad, Sudan sought to secure the border area ahead of the referendum.

In addition to warnings of civil war, it was also read that a possible civil war could involve the Lord's Resistance Army and bring Uganda into the conflict.

Despite rifts amongst Southern parties, more than 20 parties ironed over their differences to put a show of unity before the referendum. Saudi Arabian Foreign Minister Saud al-Faisal also said the referendum could "reignite violence...rather than bring peace," while he said the vote must be "fair and free."

The United States extended sanctions against Sudan on 1 November 2010 in order to pressure the government to stick to the referendum deadline. The US then offered to drop Sudan from a US list of state-sponsors of terrorism if the two referendums were held on time and the results were respected. They again partook in a statement before the referendum in lauding al-Bashir's statement to respect the vote.

Following concerns from the UN about delays, representatives of both regions affirmed a commitment to hold the referendum on time; a media campaign was also launched to raise awareness and increase the turnout.

Minni Minnawi, the only Sudan Liberation Army faction signatory to the Darfur Peace Agreement, quit the agreement and resigned his post as Special Advisor to the President, saying the deal had failed. He consequently moved to Juba in the south saying the referendum would be successful as southerners "reject the policy of this [Khartoum] government" and the north would then be a "failed state." In return, the government declared Minnawi an "enemy" and closed his Khartoum office.

In December 2010, the Constitutional Court agreed to carry out an investigation into a petition filed by local lawyers seeking the dissolution of the electoral body that was organizing the referendum.

Despite calls from the government in southern Sudan that northerners living in the south should be protected, some northerners who were uncertain of their future in an independent state started heading north.

=== Violence ===
Two days prior to the vote, David Yau Yau's militia and the SPLA clashed outside Pibor.

== External precedents ==
Questions were asked if a positive vote on the referendum would set a precedent for other secessionist movements on the African continent. An Al Jazeera English analysis said a few reasons for seeking secession were: a lack of expertise by post-colonial political elites in governing their respective countries and managing natural resources; the impact of the Cold War where many African countries took sides, rendering sovereignty ineffective; tribal prejudices and preferential service that dominate African politics; failure of governments to provide basic freedoms such as guaranteeing full citizenship for all.

Citing these examples, it asked where such a precedent for secession could lead: East Sudan and Darfur, Nigeria or South Africa. As two important members of the African Union the latter two could be reluctant to support a new independent southern Sudan as a recognition thereof could "send a very clear message to these groups in their struggle for autonomy."

== Monitors ==
Former U.S. President Jimmy Carter, former United Nations Secretary-General Kofi Annan and former Tanzanian Prime Minister Joseph Warioba led the Carter Center international observation delegation. US Senator John Kerry, Chairman of the Senate Foreign Relations Committee, visited Southern Sudan three times during the referendum period, including during polling. Actor George Clooney, who is supporting the Satellite Sentinel Project (using satellites as a conflict early warning system for Sudan), also made visits to Sudan during the referendum period. Several major regional organisations deployed international observers, including the African Union, the European Union, the League of Arab States and the Intergovernmental Authority on Development (IGAD). These organisations issued a joint press statement on the first day of polling.

Domestic observation organisations also deployed Sudanese men and women to observe the process, these included the Sudanese Network for Democratic Elections (SuNDE), the Sudan Domestic Elections Monitoring Programme (SuDEMOP) and the Sudanese Group for Democracy and Elections (SuGDE). Other national civil society organisations were also accredited as observers.

Normally, the UN does not deploy electoral observers, however, in response to a request from the parties of the CPA, the United Nations Secretary-General's Panel on the Referenda in Sudan was established. The panel is composed of three senior officials, former Tanzania President Benjamin Mkapa, former Minister of Foreign Affairs of Portugal António Monteiro, and Bhojraj Pokharel, a former Chairman of the Election Commission of Nepal, who are appointed by and report to the UN Secretary-General. The panel made periodic visits to Sudan during the referendum period and is supported by field reporting officers and stakeholder-observer liaison officers.

== Registration ==
Registration for the vote started on 15 November with Salva Kiir's appeal for registering en masse. Many of those who fled South Sudan during the civil war returned in the months and weeks leading up to the referendum, with some southern politicians trying to have them play a role in swinging the vote towards independence. Almost four million citizens registered before the deadline on 5 December; as the stream of returnees continued unabated, however, many arrived too late to register for the referendum.

== Results ==
Voting form used in the referendum

Voting on the referendum began on 9 January 2011. On 12 January, after three days of voting, representatives of the SPLA/M announced that, according to their estimates, the 60 percent turnout threshold required for the referendum's validity (corresponding to around 2.3 million voters) had been reached. Official confirmation came later the same day when the referendum commission released a statement announcing that turnout would "exceed" the required 60 percent threshold. Jimmy Carter expressed his belief on 13 January that the referendum would likely meet international standards for both the conduct of the vote and freedom of voters. The United Nations reported that preliminary results would be expected by 2 February 2011, with final results expected within the following two weeks.

According to preliminary counts reviewed by the Associated Press, consisting of 30,000 ballots in 10 polling stations, the sample had a 95% turnout with 96% in favour of secession, 3% in favour of unity and the rest invalid. Mohamed Ibrahim Khalil, chairman of the referendum commission, said 83 percent of eligible voters in the south and 53 percent in the north had voted. The South Sudan Referendum Commission affirmed the validity of the vote, however the vote was still ongoing at the time.

As voting ended, Sudan again vowed to recognise the result.

Choice	Votes	%
Separation	3,792,518	98.83
Unity	44,888	1.17
Total	3,837,406	100.00
Valid votes	3,837,406	99.62
Invalid votes	8,366	0.22
Blank votes	6,222	0.16
Total votes	3,851,994	100.00
Registered voters/turnout	3,947,676	97.58
Source: Southern Sudan Referendum Commission

=== Diaspora voting ===
Southerners living in Darfur were given the opportunity to vote in the referendum from special polling stations as some tribes advocated unity and others supported separation with possible ominous precedence for Darfur itself. Polling stations were also set up in eight countries with large South Sudanese populations, namely Australia, Canada, Egypt, Ethiopia, Kenya, Uganda, the United Kingdom and the United States. In the United States, where an estimated 25,000 to 50,000 South Sudanese nationals reside, polling booths were opened in eight states: Virginia, Massachusetts, Illinois, Texas, Tennessee, Nebraska, Arizona and Washington. Similar polling booths were set up in the Canadian cities of Calgary and Toronto, to cater to the South Sudanese community there; an estimated 40,000 to 50,000 Sudanese live in Canada, about 2,200 of whom had registered to vote in either of the two cities.

Members of the South Sudanese diaspora have been split as to their support for or against separation; members of some tribes advocate unity, while members of other tribes supported separation. Some Canadian Sudanese have called for a boycott of the referendum, accusing the International Organization for Migration, which was tasked with operating the vote in that country, of "being influenced by the government in Khartoum." Calgary-based journalist Mading Ngor of The New Sudan Vision dismissed these claims as "a conspiracy theory," adding "It's a very fragmented community here along tribal lines." Although over 99% of those in the South voted for independence, 42% of those who lived in the north at the time voted for unity.

In the United States, SPLM national secretary for external relations Suzan Jambo later credited Mangok Mangok Mayen, then head of the SPLM's U.S. national secretariat, with mobilizing people during the referendum.

=== Security ===
Several days before voting began, the SPLA/M and a rebel faction led by Lieutenant General George Athor in Jonglei State agreed to a ceasefire agreement after nearly a year of fighting, meaning a halt to military operations, troop movement and recruitment by either side. The agreement was seen as important for a "peaceful voting environment".

The day before voting began, at least six people were killed in clashes between South Sudan security forces and a pro-Khartoum Sudan militia in Unity state. One person was also killed in clashes between the Misseriya tribe and police in Abyei. The SPLA/M said the fighting started a day earlier because of the Misseriya. One day into the vote, on 10 January, a further 6 people were killed in clashes near Abyei, bringing the total to 30 dead in that region.

=== Reactions ===
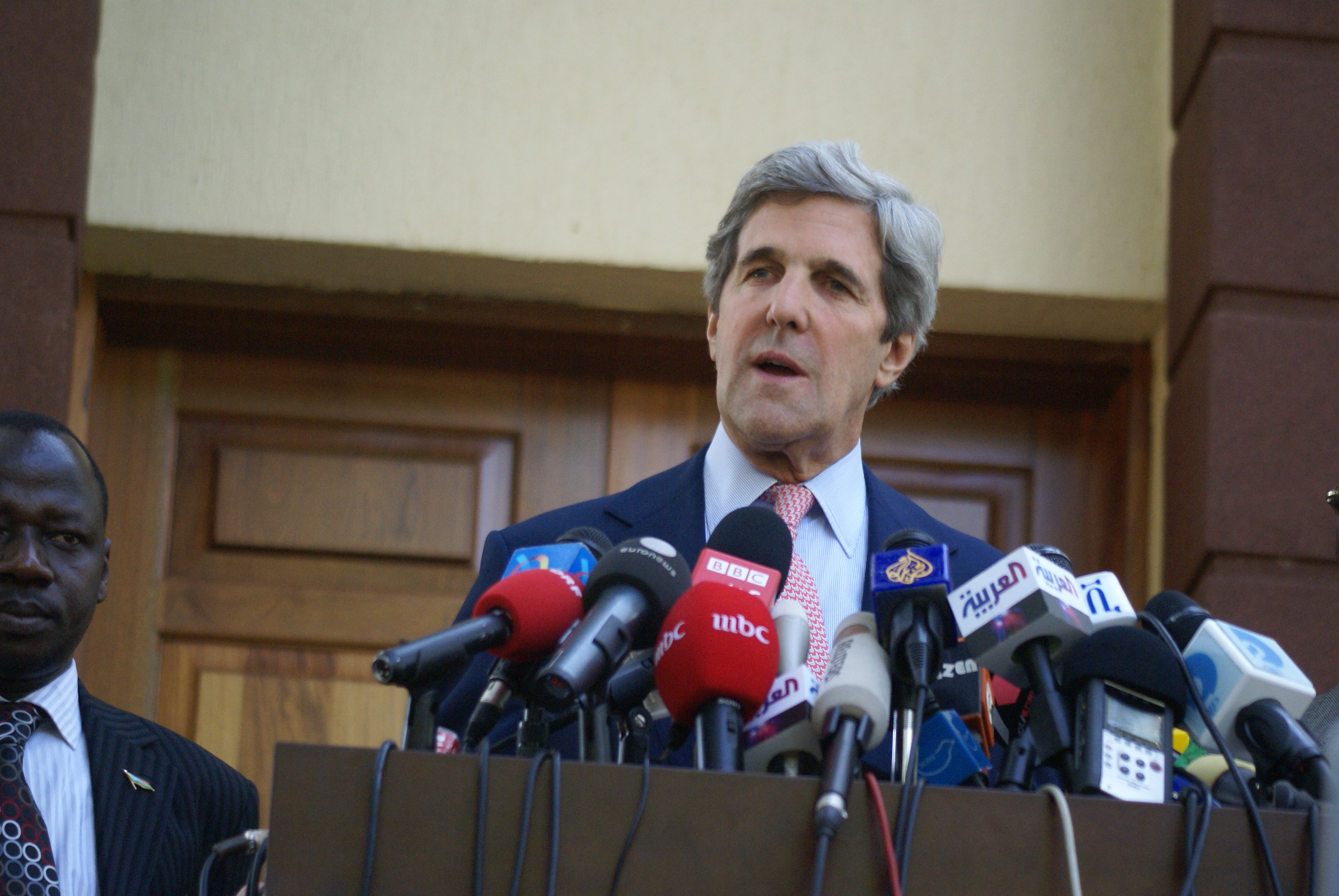
U.S. Senator John Kerry said that the referendum represented a "new chapter" for Sudan.

Domestic

As of 15 January, Radio France Internationale reported that the Sudanese central government in Khartoum had begun to recall ambassadors named by the SPLA as part of the CPA and had stopped shipping material for passports to Juba. Sudan also became the first state to recognize South Sudan.

International

President of the United States Barack Obama said the result of the vote was "inspiring" as voters decided "their own future [and marked] another step forward in Africa's long journey toward justice and democracy". He also said that the United States would recognize South Sudan's independence when it is formalized in July.

Salva Kiir met the leaders of the Polisario Front Mohamed Abdelaziz at an African Union summit. Abdel-Aziz congratulated Kiir for on a successful referendum process. He lauded "the wisdom and courage" of people of South Sudan people for a peaceful resolution of the conflict and expressed his hope that post-referendum arrangements and agreements could be finishing in the interim period before statehood. He also briefed Kiir of the Western Sahara's process to a similar referendum.

== Analysis ==
The precedence of the vote was seen as important because most African states' borders were decided during colonial times which resulted in a heterogeneous mix of religions, ethnicities, and cultures. The Organisation of African Unity, however, refrained from redrawing boundaries for the fear that wars of secession could be sparked.

== Aftermath ==
New names for an independent country were being suggested, with South Sudan being controversial as it does not offer a break from Sudan. Over 12 names had been suggested, including: Nile Republic, Jubian Republic, Kush Republic and Azania.

The SPLM proposed naming the country South Sudan, with Nile Republic, Jubian Republic, Kush Republic as other possibilities. The country was then officially named the Republic of South Sudan.

Amongst the issues to be handled by a new government are job creation.

=== Violence ===
The Minister of Cooperatives and Rural Development Jimmy Lemi Milla was shot dead in his office along with his bodyguard in an apparent personal feud.

== See also ==
- 1999 East Timorese independence referendum
- 2006 Montenegrin independence referendum
