= International reaction to the South Sudanese Civil War =

The following are international reactions to the South Sudanese Civil War:

== Sovereign states ==
=== Africa ===
Egypt - Egyptian Foreign Minister Nabil Fahmy stated that over the past few days Egypt "had paid close attention to the developments of the crisis in South Sudan, its security and humanity situation, valuing the stability of fraternal South Sudan and the strategic relations between both countries on governmental and non-governmental levels". He also added that a special envoy will be sent to South Sudan on an urgent diplomatic mission to ease talks and reassure their South Sudanese counterparts that Egypt would help them overcome the crisis. The delegation later arrived on December 27 led by Deputy Minister for African Affairs Hamdi Sanad Loza and met with South Sudan's President Salva Kiir announcing that Egypt "will support all regional efforts aimed at reaching a quick solution to the current crisis and has full confidence that all parties want to contain the crisis before it escalates". In addition, Egyptian Defense Minister Abdel Fattah el-Sisi dispatched a military aircraft that took off from an airbase on Friday morning in Egypt carrying humanitarian aid to South Sudan which was described by Loza as "a small contribution to help overcome the emergency humanitarian crisis the people of South Sudan are going through". The shipment contained urgent aid consisting of eight tonnes of food and medical supplies aimed at helping its people amid the current humanitarian crisis.

Gambia - Gambia's Secretary General and Head of the Civil Service and Minister of Presidential Affairs Momodou Sabally said that the attempted overthrow of Kiir's government was unacceptable and that the protagonists of the attempt should desist from destabilising the country.

Nigeria - Nigeria also condemned the coup and said that its "information further reveals that government forces were able to beat back the rebels...Destruction of property on a level yet to be determined has also been reported".

South Africa - After the fighting spread, South African government spokesman, Clayson Monyela, condemned the coup attempt stating "South Africa firmly believes that respect for democracy and human rights are essential to the governance of all African countries and that all violent means to overthrow legitimate governments must be rejected...It is therefore highly unfortunate that an attempt was allegedly made to undermine the stability of the country."

Uganda - Uganda's president said on Monday the nations of East Africa had agreed to move in to defeat South Sudanese rebel leader Riek Machar if he rejected a ceasefire offer, threatening to turn an outburst of ethnic fighting into a regional conflict. "We gave Riek Machar four days to respond (to the ceasefire offer) and if he doesn't we shall have to go for him, all of us," Museveni told reporters in South Sudan's capital, Juba, referring to a 31 December deadline.Asked what that meant, Museveni said: "to defeat him". He did not spell out whether South Sudan's neighbors had actually agreed to send troops to join the conflict that erupted in Juba on 15 December.But his words underlined the scale of regional concern over the fighting that has spread to South Sudan's oil-producing states - often along ethnic lines, between Machar's group, the Nuer, and President Salva Kiir's Dinka.

=== Asia ===
India - India issued an advisory for all its nationals not to travel to South Sudan and has asked those residing there to leave. India also announced that it would send a team to conduct a on-ground assessment of the political and security situation in South Sudan. The team will review the arrangements for the Indian mission staff in Juba and the conditions of Indian residents in South Sudan as well as the 2,000 Indian soldiers who are part of the UN peacekeeping force.

=== Europe ===
United Kingdom - The UK government announced it was sending an aircraft to evacuate its citizens from Juba on 19 December. The Foreign and Commonwealth Office had also warned against all travel to South Sudan and temporarily withdrew some staff and dependants from the British embassy.

Holy See - In his first Urbi et Orbi Christmas message, Pope Francis called for "social harmony in South Sudan, where current tensions have already caused numerous victims and are threatening peaceful coexistence in that young state."

=== North America ===
United States - In the first days of the conflict, the U.S. embassy in the country reported that while it was aware of "security incidents and sporadic gunfire in multiple locations" it could not confirm "that gunfire and insecurity have fully ceased. The embassy recommends that all U.S. citizens exercise extra caution at all times. The U.S. Embassy will continue to closely monitor the security environment in South Sudan, with particular attention to Juba city and its immediate surroundings, and will advise US citizens further if the security situation changes." The embassy's Twitter account reported that it denied rumours Machar had taken refuge at the base and also reiterated warnings for its citizens to "remain calm." On 18 December, the U.S. embassy asked all its citizens to "depart immediately." President Barack Obama then called for an end to the fighting amid warning of being at the "precipice" of civil war. This followed his 18 December statement that he had deployed 45 troops to the country to protect U.S. personnel and interests while warning that "recent fighting threatens to plunge South Sudan back into the dark days of its past. Fighting to settle political scores or to destabilise the government must stop immediately. Inflammatory rhetoric and targeted violence must cease. All sides must listen to the wise counsel of their neighbours, commit to dialogue and take immediate steps to urge calm and support reconciliation. South Sudan's leaders must recognise that compromise with one's political enemy is difficult; but recovering from unchecked violence and unleashed hatred will prove much harder." He also condemned the coup. After the evacuation of some citizens from the country, in accordance with the War Powers Act, Obama wrote to Speaker John Boehner and Senate President Pro-Tempore Patrick J. Leahy that he was ready to take more action to support U.S. interests and citizens there. The country's envoy to South Sudan, Donald Booth, said prior to 25 December that "we notice that the African Union has said there is Christmas season upon us, and called for all parties to cease hostilities. We support that call." Secretary of State John Kerry called on both parties to "accept a cessation of hostilities and begin mediated political talks. At the same time, U.S. Defense Department's Africom announced the deployment of a "platoon-sized" USMC contingent to neighbouring Uganda in order to protect U.S. citizens and facilities in South Sudan and to prepare for possible further evacuations. This was in addition to the nearly 100 U.S. troops in South Sudan, including the reinforcement of security at the U.S. embassy. Further, about roughly 150 USMC personnel were in Djibouti on 24 December, along with cargo planes and helicopters.

== Analysis ==
Radio Tamazuj suggested resolution of the conflict as:

At minimum a process of political reconciliation must begin between Salva Kiir, Riek Machar, Pagan Amum and their supporters. Reinstating the opposition leaders with some of their powers either within the government or party may be an option on the table. The worst option would be seeking a military solution in the style of the Khartoum regime which has tried for ten years to crush rebels in Darfur, the Nuba Mountains and Blue Nile. War would lead to immense suffering of the population. Perhaps the most likely scenario is something in between, with fast spreading military clashes all over the country, mounting pressure from the international community and finally a painstaking national reconciliation process.
Ironically, the best bet for Salva Kiir to remain in power might indeed be to count on the support of President Omar al-Bashir, whom he fought over several decades. If the situation continues to run out of hand, the Nuer militia might take control over oilfields in their homelands, which would cut off the oil flow to Khartoum, endangering the stability of the economy and thereby putting the regime at risk of a popular uprising. Sudan’s main interest then is to protect the flow of oil to the north. In one scenario, Khartoum would move to help defend the oil wells and facilities by military means, while providing other forms of support to Salva Kiir such as air power. In another scenario, Khartoum would divide and again rule South Sudan by supporting its former Nuer allies like Riek Machar.

Kiir's swapping of his traditional suit and cowboy hat for military fatigues was noted by commentators and analysts to be indicative of the gravity of the situation. Another noticeable and concerning event from the rebellion was the division within the presidential guards that had been internationally trained and noted for their unity despite ethnic diversity. This was read as showing strains after decades of conflict with "a rebel-movement turned government that is riven by infighting between former warlords vying for a piece of this oil-rich new nation". Kiir's televised statement also controversially made reference to Machar as determined to "persistently pursue his actions of the past", in reference to a 1991 split that led to a massacre between the Dinka and Nuer minority. It was also suggested that the spark behind the revolt was rumours of arrests after "a series of publci [sic] statements criticising Kiir's increasingly dictatorial style". South Sudanese politics has been criticised for the ethnic dominance of the Dinka tribes, being derogatively referred to as a "Dinkocracy". U.S. Ambassador to South Sudan Susan D. Page suggested that there was not as much support for Machar in an organised manner, but a general discontent over the economic and political spheres tied to a crackdown on personal freedoms that resulted in a national disunity of an identity only forged by war.

The ICG's Casie Copeland said of the ethnic fighting that "even if there is a political deal, it will be very difficult to put the genie back in the bottle" and that it was concerning that UNMISS had "not begun patrolling in Juba and has not reached areas where civilians are concentrated." Copeland added that "it appears both sides are fighting for their political survival. The impact of this fighting is going to shape the future of South Sudan. Parts of Juba have been reduced to rubble. Ethnic tensions have been brought into the open with devastating impact, and the political dispensation of South Sudan is going to be shaped by what's happened in the last few days." The ICG later added: "The scenario many feared but dared not contemplate looks frighteningly possible: South Sudan, the world's newest state, is now arguably on the cusp of a civil war."

Jeffrey Gettleman's piece "Quandary in South Sudan: Should It Lose Its Hard-Won Independence?" outlines the nuances of a prospective international intervention in the South Sudanese civil war, and highlights the competing arguments that favor or oppose such an intervention. Specifically, Gettleman tackles the question of whether South Sudan should have its sovereignty revoked and be established as a "trusteeship" run by international actors until the conflict subsides. While African political thinkers like Mahmood Mamdani advocate for the establishment of an internationally-sanctioned and managed transitional government, Gettleman points out that the deep social cleavages of South Sudan make such an effort less feasible. Namely, he notes the tensions between the Dinka and the Nuer ethnic groups that have ordered the new rivalries at shortly after independence in 2011. However, other scholars beyond the scope of Gettleman's article have discussed the merits of either peacekeeping operations and internationally-sanctioned governing trusteeships. Virginia Page Fortna concludes that internationally-led peacekeeping operations significantly reduces the possibility that a host country will relapse into civil war. Fortna notes that although peacekeeping may be more successful at ensuring a state's security, it does not necessarily guarantee its democratization or institutional strengthening. In contrast, however, Jeremy Weinstein contends that armed military interventions precludes the fully development of institutionally functional states. Drawing on the work of Tilly, such armed campaigns prevent the process of bureaucracy-building that arises from war–namely, the state extracting rents and building an institutional capacity to collect taxes and mobilize a large army necessary for military campaigns. This should suggest that such a campaign, were it to occur in South Sudan, may be predisposed to being successful strictly in terms of maintaining peace, but not regarding building state capacity.

== International organizations ==
African Union - An African Union mediation team arrived in Juba on 19 December 2013 with representatives from Ethiopia, Kenya, Uganda and Rwanda. South Sudan government spokesman Ateny Wek Ateny said: "The African Union is till now meeting with the president. Their message is that they are trying to broker peace between the two forces," while he added "Bor has surrendered actually because the forces that were in Bor were mainly loyal to Machar. They control the town but government forces are trying to retake the town."

Intergovernmental Authority on Development - On 27 December 2013, East African leaders gave the warring factions four days to lay down their arms, warning that IGAD will "take action" to stop the conflict in a communique issued in Nairobi. The IGAD leaders said they would not accept a violent overthrow of the country's democratically elected government, and said any change must come through the democratic process. In a statement released on 28 December, United Nations Secretary-General Ban Ki-moon said he lauded IGAD for "appointing a mediation team to work with the government of south Sudan and opposition in reaching a cease-fire, the release of the detainees and building toward a process of peaceful dialogue.".

O - The OIC's General Secretariat and office of Ekmeleddin İhsanoğlu condemned the coup saying: "Within the framework of ensuring security and stability in the region and stressing the promotion of good-neighborliness among states of the region, especially between the Republics of the Sudan and Southern Sudan, the OIC General Secretariat condemned the attempted coup which took place yesterday morning in the Republic of Southern Sudan".

United Nations - Secretary-General Ban's Special Representative for South Sudan Hilde Johnson issued a statement that read UNMISS was "deeply concerned" about the fighting and that "as the Special Representative of the Secretary-General I urge all parties in the fighting to cease hostilities immediately and exercise restraint. I have been in touch regularly with the key leaders, including at the highest levels to call for calm." On 17 December, Ban spoke to Kiir calling for the government to provide an "offer of dialogue to its opponents and to resolve their respective differences peacefully." Later, the United Nations Security Council was also told of as many as 500 deaths, 800 people injured and 20,000 seeking refuge at UN centres. French Ambassador and UNSC President for December Gérard Araud said: "Fighting is on ethnic lines, which could result in a very dangerous situation" and the UNMIS has the authority to use force if necessary. On 22 December, UN Humanitarian Coordinator in South Sudan Toby Lanzer wrote on Twitter from the UN base in Bor that over 15,000 people were sheltering there and that "things are changing by the hour. We are under intense pressure here, as are other locations in Jonglei. Massive setback for South Sudan."

On 24 December, after the UN High Commissioner for Human Rights Navi Pillay expressed concern about the conflict, the discovery of mass graves and the arrests of hundreds of civilians in the searches of homes and hotels, the UNSC voted to add about 6,000 international troops and 1,323 police officers to the existing over 7,600 UNMISS' personnel, including about 900 police personnel. The resolution was passed under Chapter VII of the UN Charter which authorises the use of force; at the same time the SC demanded an immediate cessation of hostilities and opening a dialogue between the rival factions. The additional troops would come from other UN missions in the Democratic Republic of Congo (DRC), Côte d'Ivoire, Liberia and neighbouring Sudan's Darfur and Abyei regions, where the latter also have an interest in South Sudan. Ban said: "We have reports of horrific attacks. Tens of thousands have fled their homes...innocent civilians are being targeted because of their ethnicity." He also suggested targeted attacks could constitute war crimes or crimes against humanity, but warned that "this is a political crisis which requires a peaceful, political solution." The resolution also answered India's concerns, as they have over 2,000 of the 7,000 troops in the country, over the UNMISS candidate by gaining the support of France, the U.S., Russia, Guatemala and Pakistan (the latter two of which are troop contributors). India's concerns entailed responsibility for protection of civilians as part of peacekeeping operations, with India suggesting the upsurge in violence could unleash a civil war which would "alter the terms of reference of the presence of UNMISS [in regards to the original 2011 mandate of resolution 1996] completely;" India also suggested the conflicts raison d'etre as being one of intertribal or ethnic conflict, which was reflected in the first paragraph of the resolution. Both sides thus needed to agree to dialogue to resolve their differences. India's other concern was that its troops were deployed to remote areas in small numbers and are thus at the front of the "brunt of the violence" and need to be augmented. The resolutions endorsement that UNMISS has the right to take action to protect its mandate "gives our peacekeepers the necessary flexibility to respond to the attacks against their positions." The UN reported that over 81,000 people were displaced by 25 December and up to 90,000, including 58,000 at UN facilities.

On 27 December, 72 United Nations peacekeepers reportedly arrived in Juba as the first Security Council-approved additional peacekeepers, increasing the total to 12,500 soldiers and 1,323 police officers. Meanwhile, U.N. officials and workers reportedly struggled to protect and provide food, shelter and medical care to internally displaced persons, of whom more than 63,000 people now crowded on to U.N. bases seeking shelter from the violence.
