= Mohammad Main Ullah Chowdhury =

Major General (Retired) of the Bangladesh Army

Main Ullah Chowdhury
- Military career
- Allegiance: Bangladesh
- Branch: Bangladesh Army
- Service years: 1987–2023
- Rank: Major General
- Unit: Bangladesh Infantry Regiment
- Commands: Force Commander of MINURSO; GOC of 10th Infantry Division; Commandant of the Bangladesh Military Academy; GOC of 7th Infantry Division; Commander of 101st Infantry Brigade
- Conflicts: UNMISS; MINURSO
- Awards: Senabahini Padak (SBP); Sena Utkorsho Padak(SUP); Oshamanno Sheba Padak(OSP)

Mohammad Main Ullah Chowdhury (Note: SUP, OSP, awc, psc) is a retired two-star officer of the Bangladesh Army and former force commander of the United Nations Mission for Referendum in Western Sahara (MINURSO). In the same mission, he served as deputy force commander, United Nations Mission in South Sudan. Prior to joining UNMISS, he served as general officer commanding of two infantry divisions.

== Education ==
Chowdhury was commissioned from the Bangladesh Military Academy with the 17th BMA Long Course into the East Bengal Regiment. He received an undergraduate degree from Defence Services Command and Staff College and holds two master's degrees, in strategic studies from United States Army War College and in defense studies from National University, Bangladesh.

== Military career ==
Chowdhury had a distinguished career in the Bangladesh Army. As a major, he served as an instructor with the Para-Commando Battalion and as a platoon commander at the Bangladesh Military Academy (BMA). After completing the Defence Services Command and Staff College (DSCSC), he was appointed as the brigade major (BM) of the 44 Infantry Brigade. Following this, he commanded the 13 East Bengal Regiment as a lieutenant colonel, leading operations in Jessore and Rangamati as a zonal commander.

He later served as a general staff officer grade 1 (GSO-1) at the Armed Forces Division (AFD), where he played a key role in major disaster management efforts, including coordinating military operations during Cyclone Sidr.

Upon promotion to colonel, he was appointed as the personal staff officer (PS) to the chief of army staff. Subsequently, he commanded the 93 Armoured Brigade and later served as the director of the Movement and Training Directorate at Army Headquarters.

Following his elevation to the rank of major general, he held several prominent leadership positions. He served as the commandant of the Bangladesh Military Academy (BMA) and as the general officer commanding (GOC) of both the 7th Infantry Division at Lebukhali and the 10th Infantry Division at Ramu Cantonment.

On the international front, Chowdhury represented Bangladesh with distinction, serving successfully as the force commander of the United Nations Mission in South Sudan (UNMISS) and the United Nations Mission for the Referendum in Western Sahara (MINURSO).

He concluded his career as the commandant of the Bangladesh Infantry Regimental Centre (BIRC), retiring as a two-star general.

=== United Nations peacekeeping missions ===
Main was appointed for United Nations peacekeeping as deputy force commander of the United Nations Mission in South Sudan. Soon after, in 2020, he was designated as force commander for the United Nations Mission for the Referendum in Western Sahara. He returned to army headquarters in 2022 and was replaced by Major General Fakhrul Ahsan as force commander.
