= Flight 544 =

Flight 544 may refer to:

- Pakistan International Airlines Flight 544, hijacked on 25 May 1998
- United Nations Flight 544, shot down on 21 December 2012
