= Junhui Wu =

Chinese military officer

Major General Junhui Wu is a Chinese military officer currently serving as Force Commander of the United Nations Mission in South Sudan (UNMISS) appointed by the United Nations Secretary-General António Guterres in March 2025 succeeding Lieutenant General Mohan Subramanian.

== Education ==
Wu earned a Bachelor of Arts degree in Command from Shijiazhuang Academy of Military Command, China and a master's degree in Military Science from National Defence University, China.

== Career ==
Wu, an Infantry officer of Chinese national army spent his early career on foreign missions; first as a military observer in United Nations Mission for the Referendum in Western Sahara from 1997 to 1998 and as deputy senior military observer in United Nations Organization Stabilization Mission in the Democratic Republic of the Congo (MONUSCO) from 2002 to 2003. In 2006, he was deployed as planning officer at the United Nations Headquarters in New York serving until 2008 when returned to China.

In 2009, he was appointed commanding Officer in the Mechanized Infantry Brigade and in 2010, served as Commanding Officer in the Mechanized Infantry Division until 2012 when he was appointed assistant director-general of the Peacekeeping Affairs Office at the Ministry of National Defense of China coordinating Chinese military participation in the United Nations peacekeeping operations. From 2014 to 2018, he served as defense Attaché in Syria and in Canada from 2018 to 2021.

In 2021, he was deployed to the Embassy of China in Germany as defense attaché coordinating diplomatic policies and bilateral military relations. Wu was appointed Force Commander of the United Nations Mission in South Sudan (UNMISS) by the United Nations Secretary-General António Guterres in March 2025.
