= Russia–Rwanda relations =

- Russia: Rwanda

Russia–Rwanda relations (Russian: Российско-руандийские отношения) refers to the bilateral relationship between the two countries, Russia and Rwanda. Russia has an embassy in Kigali.

== History ==
=== Soviet-era relations ===
On 30 June 1962, a day before Rwanda gained independence from Belgium, the Soviet Union sent a telegram to Kigali recognising Rwanda as a sovereign and independent state, and offered to establish diplomatic relations. Diplomatic relations were established between the two states on 17 October 1963.

=== Modern ties ===
Rwanda recognised the Russian Federation in January 1992 as the successor state of the Soviet Union, after the latter's dissolution. Due to financial difficulties, the Rwandan embassy in Moscow closed at the end of 1995, and all the activities of the Embassy were shifted to the Rwandan Embassy in Berlin-Germany until recently in March 2013 when Rwandan cabinet appointed its new ambassador to Russia to be based in Moscow.

== Overview of present relations ==
The current ambassador of Rwanda to Russia is Lieutenant General Frank Mushyo Kamanzi, while the current ambassador of Russia to Rwanda is Alexander Polyakov, who was appointed by Russian president Vladimir Putin in June, 14 2024.

=== Official visits ===
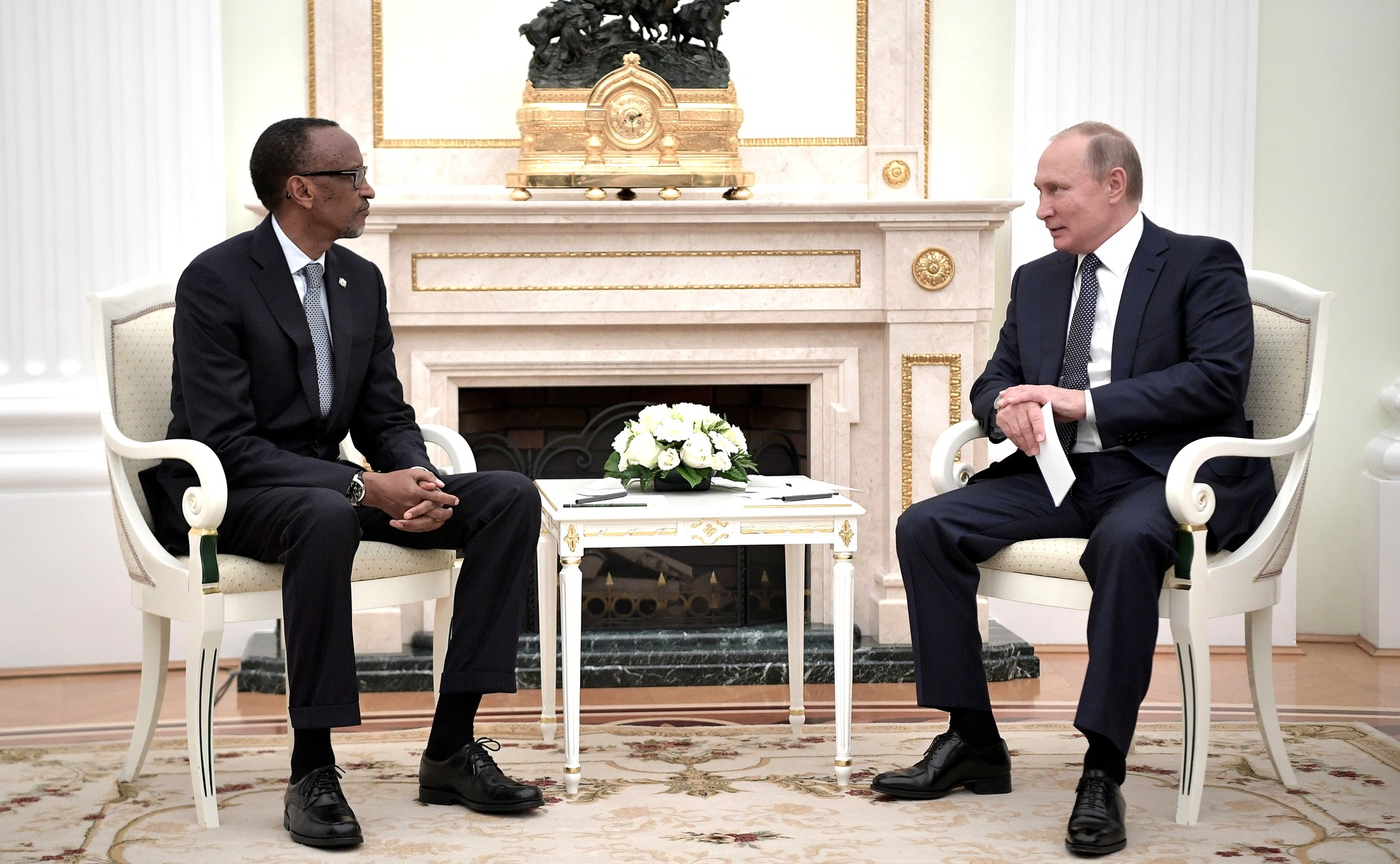
Meeting between Putin and Kagame in the Grand Kremlin Palace in 2018.

Russian president Vladimir Putin and Rwandan president Paul Kagame met on the sidelines of the 2018 FIFA World Cup opening ceremony in June 2018. Kagame visited again on his birthday in 2019 during the 1st Russia-Africa Summit.

=== Humanitarian ties ===
In 2003, Charles Murigande the then Rwanda foreign minister called on Russia for assistance with public health services. He noted that there was 1 doctor for every 50,000 Rwandans, and in 1989 the Soviet Union promised assistance in this field, but it was not forthcoming due to problems with payment.

=== Nuclear cooperation ===
In May 2026, Rwanda and Russia signed a Memorandum of Understanding (MoU) on nuclear medicine and healthcare cooperation, building on a 2018 framework agreement. The deal is part of Russia's broader strategy to expand influence in Africa as Western partnerships are seen as inconsistent.

== Ambassadors ==
=== Russian ambassadors to Rwanda ===
- Yevgeny Afanasenko (November 1, 1966 - May 24, 1972)
- Grigory Zhilyakov (June 2, 1972 - May 19, 1978)
- Gennady Rykov (May 19, 1978 - November 17, 1984)
- Gennady Sokolov (November 17, 1984 - August 23, 1990)
- Petru Comendant (August 23, 1990 - January 11, 1994)
- Anatoly Smirnov (January 11, 1994 - July 28, 1998)
- Stanislav Akhmedov (July 28, 1998 - September 17, 2002)
- Alexey Dulyan (September 17, 2002 - December 20, 2006)
- Mirgayas Shirinsky (December 20, 2006 - May 22, 2013)
- Andrey Polyakov (May 22, 2013 - October 31, 2017)
- Karen Chalyan (March 14, 2018 - 18 June 2024)
- Alexander Polyakov (August 31 2024 - present)

=== Rwandan ambassadors to Russia ===
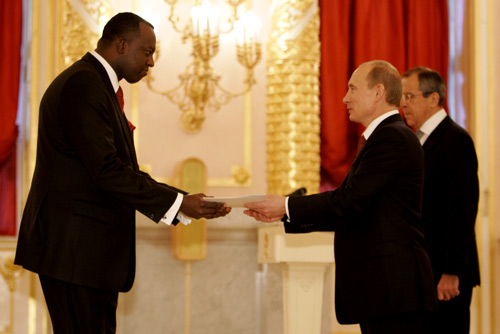
Eugène-Richard Gasana presents his Letter of Credence to President of Russia Vladimir Putin on 11 December 2007.

- Eugène-Richard Gasana (December 11, 2007-July 14, 2011)
- Christine Nkurikiyinka (July 14, 2011-January 16, 2014)
- Jeanne d'Arc Mujawamariya (January 16, 2014-November 4, 2019)
- Lieutenant General Frank Mushyo Kamanzi (since November 29, 2019)

== Bibliography ==
- Ginsburgs, George; Slusser, Robert M. (1981). A calendar of Soviet treaties, 1958-1973. BRILL. ISBN 9028606092.
