= Shailesh Tinaikar =

Indian military officer

Lieutenant General Shailesh Tinaikar SM, VSM
- Born: 1962 (age 63–64)
- Military career
- Allegiance: India
- Branch: Indian Army
- Rank: Lieutenant General
- Unit: 10 Para(SF)
- Awards: Sena Medal; Vishisht Seva Medal

Lieutenant General Shailesh Tinaikar, SM, VSM (born 1962), is a retired Indian Army officer who served as the Force Commander of the United Nations Mission in South Sudan (UNMISS), the second biggest peacekeeping operation. He served from 24 May 2019 to January 2022. He was appointed by United Nations Secretary-General António Guterres to succeed Lieutenant General Frank Mushyo Kamanzi of Rwanda. Prior to that, he served as the Commandant of the Indian Army Infantry School. He is the recipient of the Sena Medal and the Vishisht Seva Medal for distinguished service.

== Early life and education ==
Tinaikar graduated from the National Defence Academy and Indian Military Academy in 1983. He received an MPhil in defence and strategic studies from The University of Madras.

== Career ==
Tinaikar was commissioned into the elite 10 PARA (SF). He appointed the Commandant of the Infantry School in July 2018. he held the position of Additional Director General of Military Operations at the Army Headquarters from 2017 to 2018. He commanded a division, a recruit training centre and a brigade from 2012 to 2017.

Tinaikar served in the United Nations Angola Verification Mission III from 1996 to 1997 and, from 2008 to 2009, he served in the United Nations Mission in Sudan.

On 24 May 2019, Tinaikar was appointed as the Force Commander of the United Nations Mission in South Sudan (UNMISS) by United Nations Secretary-General António Guterres.

== Honours and decorations ==

	Sena Medal	Vishisht Seva Medal	
Special Service Medal	Operation Vijay Star	Operation Vijay Medal	Operation Parakram Medal
Sainya Seva Medal	Videsh Seva Medal	50th Anniversary of Independence Medal	30 Years Long Service Medal
20 Years Long Service Medal	9 Years Long Service Medal	UN Mission in Angola Medal	UN Mission in Sudan Medal
