= United Nations peacekeeping =

International missions to maintain peace after armed conflict

United Nations Peacekeeping
- Founded: 1948; 78 years ago
- Website: peacekeeping.un.org/en

Leadership
- UN Secretary-General: António Guterres
- Under-Secretary-General for Peace Operations: Jean-Pierre Lacroix
- Chief of Staff: Brigadier General Yakhya Diop
- Military Adviser for Peacekeeping Operations: Lieutenant General Cheryl Pearce
- Director of the Office for Peacekeeping Strategic Partnership: Lieutenant General Mohan Subramanian

Personnel
- Active personnel: 53,213 total

Expenditure
- Budget: $5.66 billion

Related articles
- History: United Nations peacekeeping missions

United Nations peacekeeping is the deployment of international military, police, and civilian personnel under United Nations command to help countries transition from conflict to peace. Authorized by the United Nations Security Council and administered by the Department of Peace Operations, peacekeeping missions are one of the principal instruments through which the United Nations addresses threats to international peace and security. It is distinguished from peacemaking, peace enforcement, and peacebuilding, although these activities may overlap in practice.

Peacekeeping is not mentioned in the United Nations Charter; it developed during the Cold War as an improvised response to crises the Security Council was unable to address through the originally planned collective security provisions. Peacekeeping is governed by three principles: there must be consent of the parties, impartiality, and non-use of force except in self-defense and defense of the mandate. The mandates of UN peacekeeping missions have expanded significantly over time, from early observer deployments to multidimensional operations which may support complex peace agreements or protect civilians in active conflicts under Chapter VII of the UN Charter. Peacekeepers may include soldiers, police, and civilian participants; they wear their home countries' uniforms and Blue Helmets or Blue Berets, which have become synonymous with UN peacekeeping.

Since 1948, more than two million people from 125 countries have served in 72 UN peacekeeping operations; the forces were collectively awarded the Nobel Peace Prize in 1988. As of 2026, eleven operations are active, with a combined budget of $5.66 billion and around 53,000 personnel deployed from 117 countries, the largest contributors being Nepal, Rwanda, Bangladesh, India, and Pakistan. Scholars have found that peacekeeping is associated with reduced conflict recurrence and fewer civilian casualties, although effectiveness varies with the local situation and a mission's mandate.

The current head of the Department of Peace Operations is Jean-Pierre Lacroix, who has held the office since 1 April 2017.

== Conceptual foundations ==
=== Non-charter origins ===
The UN Charter makes no reference to peacekeeping. Its framers envisioned a collective security system in which the Security Council, supported by armed forces made available by member states under Article 43 and coordinated through the Military Staff Committee established under Article 47, would respond directly to threats to international peace and security. However, this system never functioned as designed due to disagreements between the two sides of the beginning Cold War. Peacekeeping subsequently developed as an improvised institutional response to crises which the Security Council wanted to address despite the failure of the original mechanisms.

Because peacekeeping had no Charter basis, UN Secretary-General Dag Hammarskjöld described it as a "Chapter Six and a Half" activity, situated between the peaceful dispute settlement mandated under Chapter VI, and the military measures authorized under Chapter VII. The phrase has remained the standard shorthand for peacekeeping's legal and operational position, and its emergence from the necessity of working around the Charter's practical limits.

=== Core principles ===
UN peacekeeping follows three core principles, first articulated by Hammarskjöld in 1958 and subsequently codified in the 2008 UN Peacekeeping Operations: Principles and Guidelines, commonly known as the Capstone Doctrine. These principles are:

1. Peacekeepers must be deployed with the consent of the parties to the conflict, who must be committed to a political process. Without such consent, an operation risks becoming a party to the conflict and being drawn toward enforcement action.
2. Peacekeepers must exhibit impartiality, implementing their mandate without favour or prejudice to any party. Impartiality is not equivalent to neutrality: a peacekeeping operation may penalize infractions of the peace process while remaining impartial in its dealings with the parties.
3. Peacekeepers must not use force except in self-defense, and in defense of the mandate. They are generally not an offensive force, but are allowed to proactively deter forceful attempts to disrupt their mandate in what is called "robust peacekeeping".

The three principles are interdependent and have been stretched (particularly the third) by the demands of post-Cold War deployments. The Security Council, even when authorizing robust mandates under Chapter VII, regularly reaffirms them in operative paragraphs of mission resolutions.

=== Distinction from other activities ===
Peacekeeping is distinguished from three related activities: Peacemaking refers to diplomatic efforts to bring hostile parties to a negotiated agreement, typically through mediation or arbitration under Chapter VI of the Charter. Peace enforcement refers to the use of coercive measures, including military force, to restore international peace and security under Chapter VII; it does not require the consent of the parties and is generally undertaken by member-state coalitions or regional organisations authorized by the Security Council, rather than by UN-commanded forces. Peacebuilding refers to longer-term efforts to address the structural causes of conflict and to consolidate peace, including support for institutions and economic recovery. The UN acknowledges that these activities are mutually reinforcing and that contemporary peacekeeping operations frequently incorporate aspects of these other processes.

== Ongoing missions ==
Acronym	Name	Country/region	Start year	2025–26 budget	Ref
MINURSO	Mission for the Referendum in Western Sahara	Western Sahara	1991	$71M	
MINUSCA	Stabilization Mission in the Central African Republic	Central African Republic	2014	$1170M	
MONUSCO	Stabilization Mission in the Congo	DR Congo	2010	$870M	
UNDOF	Disengagement Observer Force	Israel / Syria	1974	$70M	
UNFICYP	Peacekeeping Force in Cyprus	Cyprus	1964	$57M	
UNIFIL	Interim Force in Lebanon	Israel / Lebanon	1978	$550M	
UNISFA	Interim Security Force for Abyei	Sudan / South Sudan	2011	$310M	
UNMIK	Interim Administration Mission in Kosovo	Kosovo	1999	$46M	
UNMISS	Mission in South Sudan	South Sudan	2011	$1190M	
UNMOGIP	Military Observer Group in India and Pakistan	India / Pakistan	1951	$9M	
UNTSO	Truce Supervision Organization	Middle East	1948	$42M	

== History ==
Scholars commonly divide the history of UN peacekeeping into three "generations" of traditional, multidimensional, and robust peacekeeping, each of which have distinct mandates and practices. However, these are not formal UN classifications, and the periods have some overlap in practice.

=== Traditional peacekeeping (1948–1988) ===
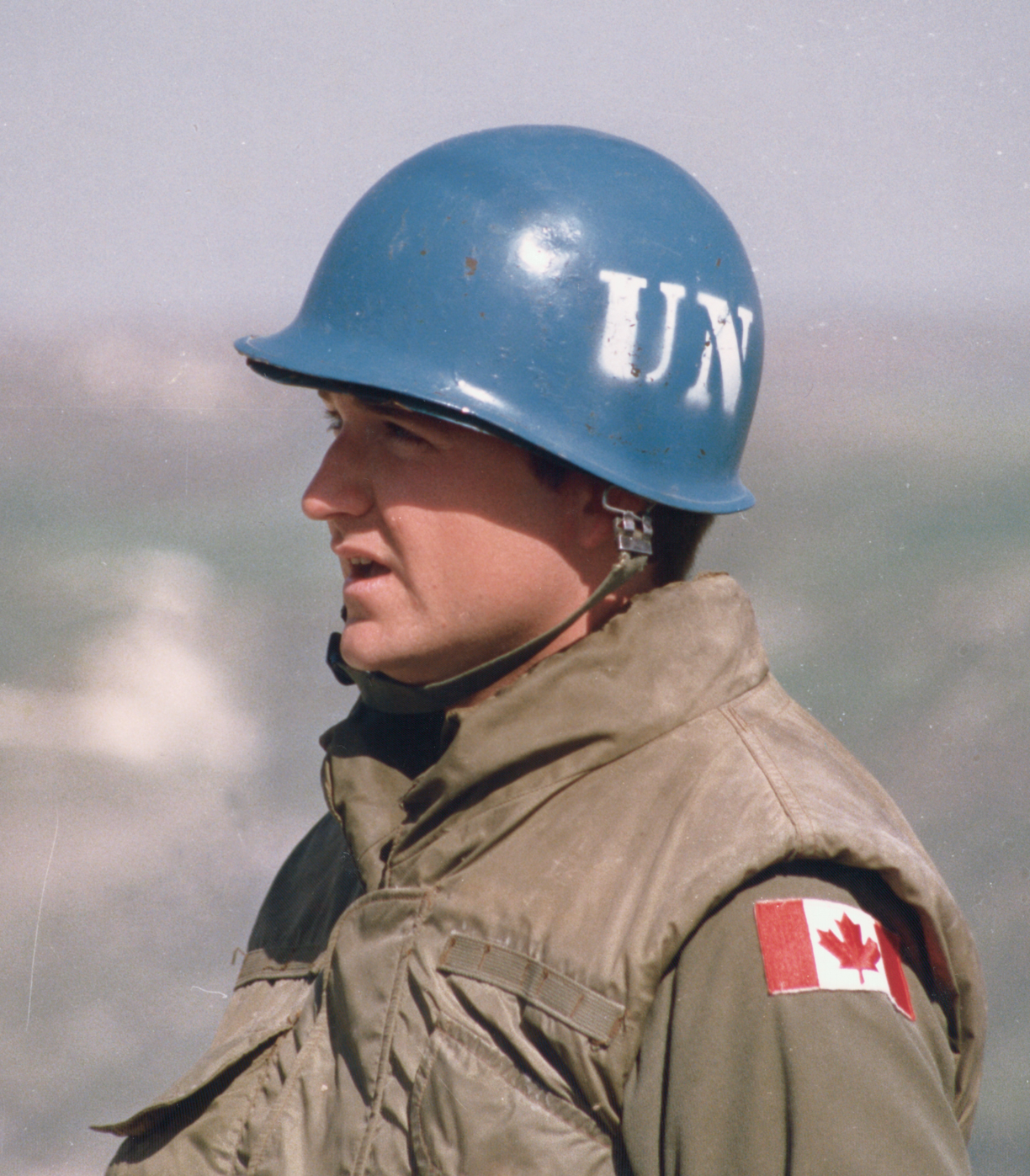
Canadian peacekeeper in 1976 wearing the distinctive UN blue helmet

The first peacekeeping mission was initiated as the UN Truce Supervision Organization (UNTSO), which was designed to oversee a ceasefire between the warring parties in the 1948 Arab–Israeli War. UNTSO remains operative more than 75 years after its creation. In 1951, the UN Military Observer Group in India and Pakistan (UNMOGIP) was authorized to monitor relations between the two nations after the partition of India in 1947 as a result of decolonization.

Both UNTSO and UNMOGIP were small, unarmed observer missions. This evolved into armed, interpositional peacekeeping during the 1956 Suez Crisis, after France and the United Kingdom vetoed Security Council action against the Anglo-French-Israeli intervention in Egypt. In response, the General Assembly invoked the 1950 "Uniting for Peace" resolution and requested Secretary-General Dag Hammarskjöld to present a plan for a peacekeeping force. Hammarskjöld drew on a proposal of Canadian Secretary of State for External Affairs Lester Bowles Pearson, who had initially suggested a peacekeeping force of mainly Canadian peacekeepers. However, Egypt did not believe a Commonwealth nation's troops would be sufficiently neutral, and Hammarskjöld thus designed the multi-national UN Emergency Force (UNEF). UNEF supervised troop withdrawals and remained as a buffer between Egyptian and Israeli forces until 1967. Pearson won the Nobel Peace Prize in 1957 for his work.

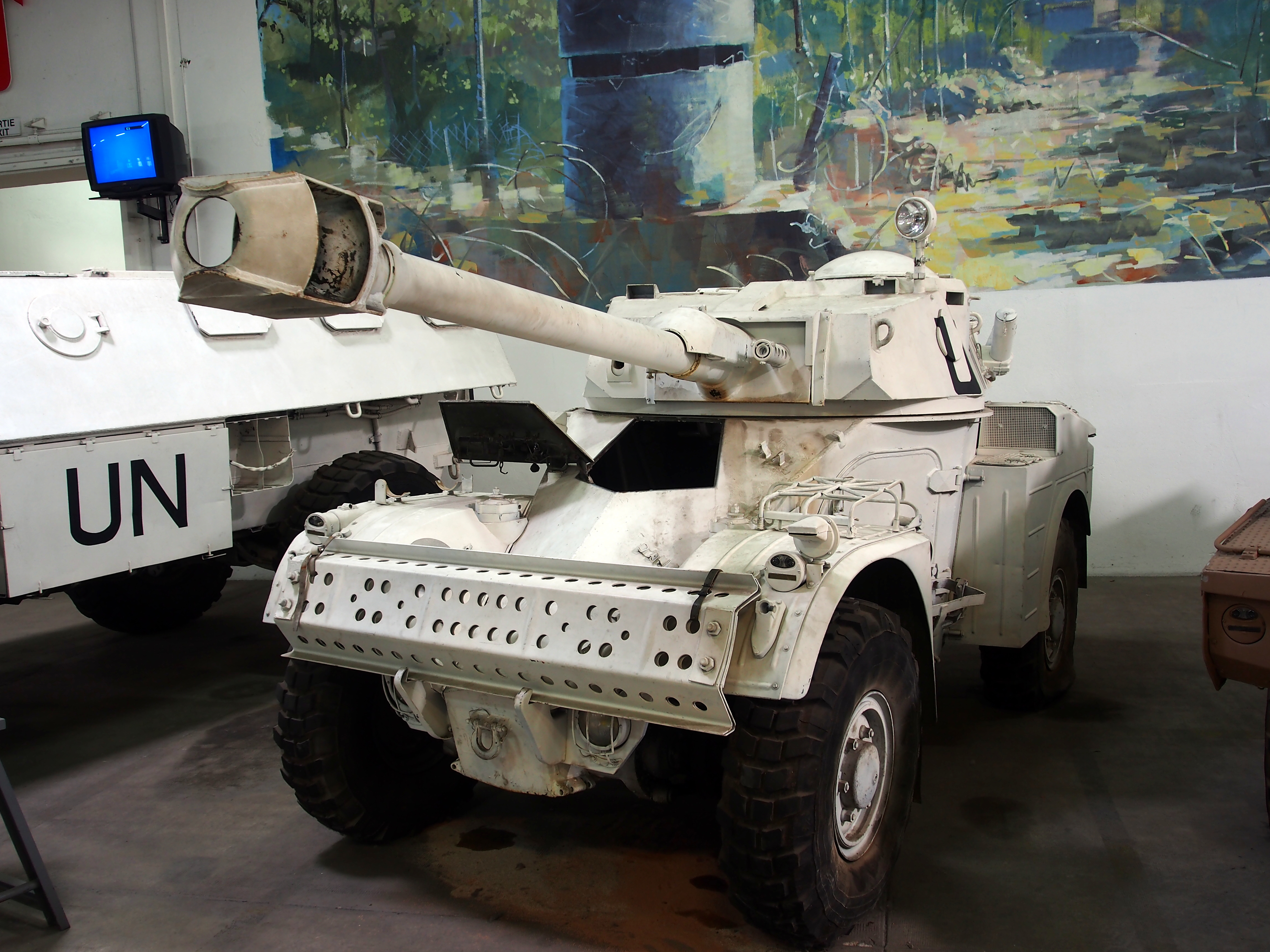
Peacekeepers' Panhard armoured car in the Musée des Blindés, Saumur, France. These vehicles have served with the UN since the inception of UNFICYP.

Subsequent first-generation operations followed the UNEF template: small, lightly armed missions which acted as observers and buffers, staffed predominantly by non-aligned or middle-power states, operated with the consent of the host state, and used force only in self-defense. Notable examples include the UN Operation in the Congo (ONUC, 1960–1964), the UN Peacekeeping Force in Cyprus (UNFICYP, 1964–present), and the UN Disengagement Observer Force (UNDOF) on the Golan Heights (1974–present). ONUC was the most ambitious of these missions and at points strained the conventional bounds of traditional peacekeeping, deploying significant force against Katangese secessionists; Hammarskjöld died in a plane crash in September 1961 while travelling to negotiate a ceasefire with the Katangese leadership.

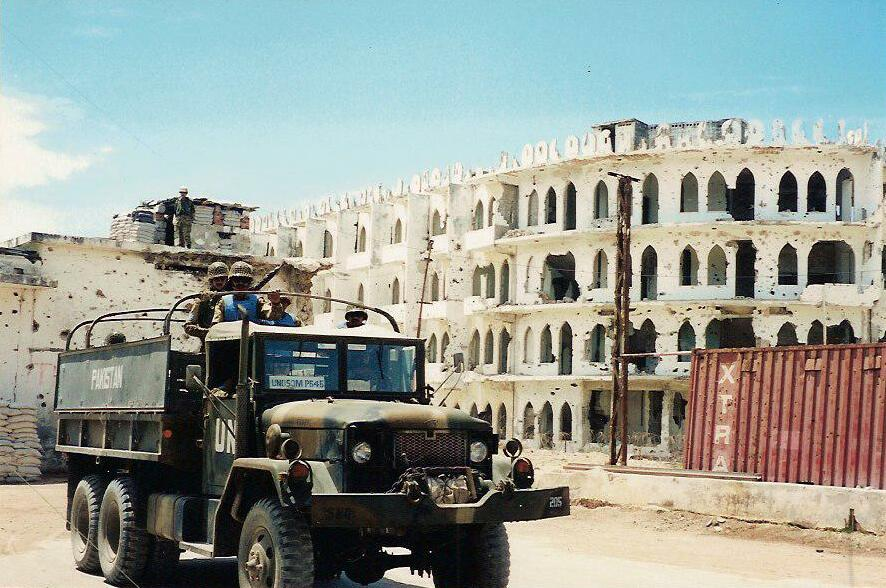
A Pakistani UNOSOM armed convoy making the rounds in Mogadishu

In 1988, the Nobel Peace Prize was awarded collectively to the UN peacekeeping forces. The Norwegian Nobel Committee stated that the forces "represent the manifest will of the community of nations" and had "made a decisive contribution" to the resolution of conflict around the world. By that point thirteen operations had been authorized; another five would be approved in 1988–1989 alone, marking the beginning of a sharp expansion in UN peacekeeping activity.

=== Multidimensional peacekeeping (1988–1999) ===
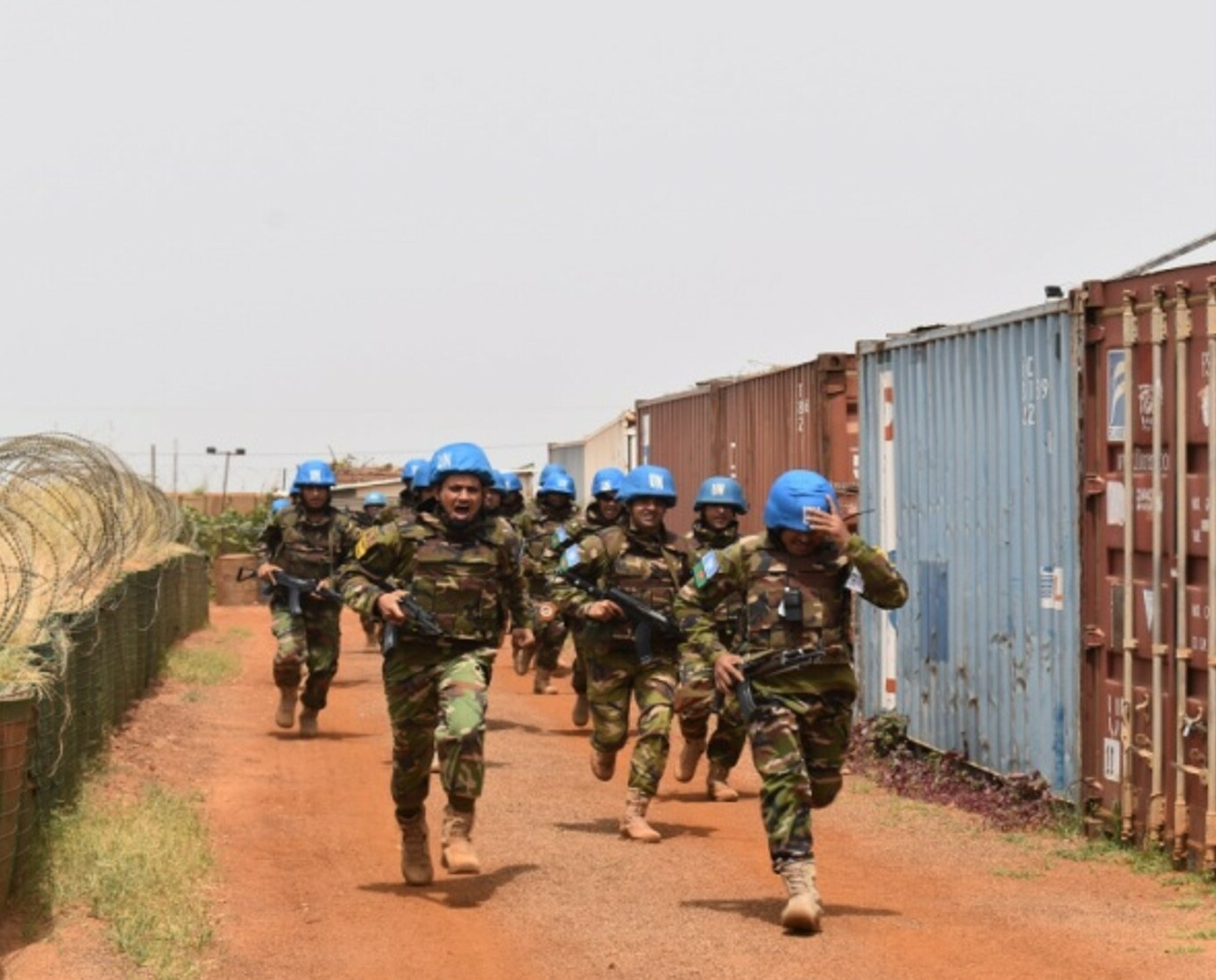
Bangladesh forces under MINUSMA Mali

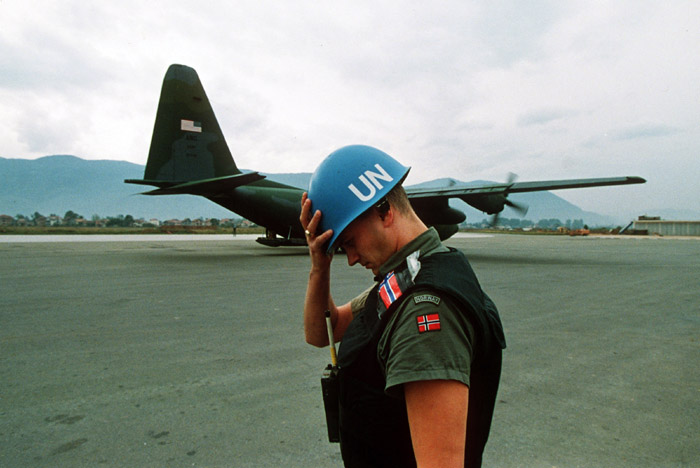
Norwegian Peacekeeper during the Siege of Sarajevo, 1992–1993

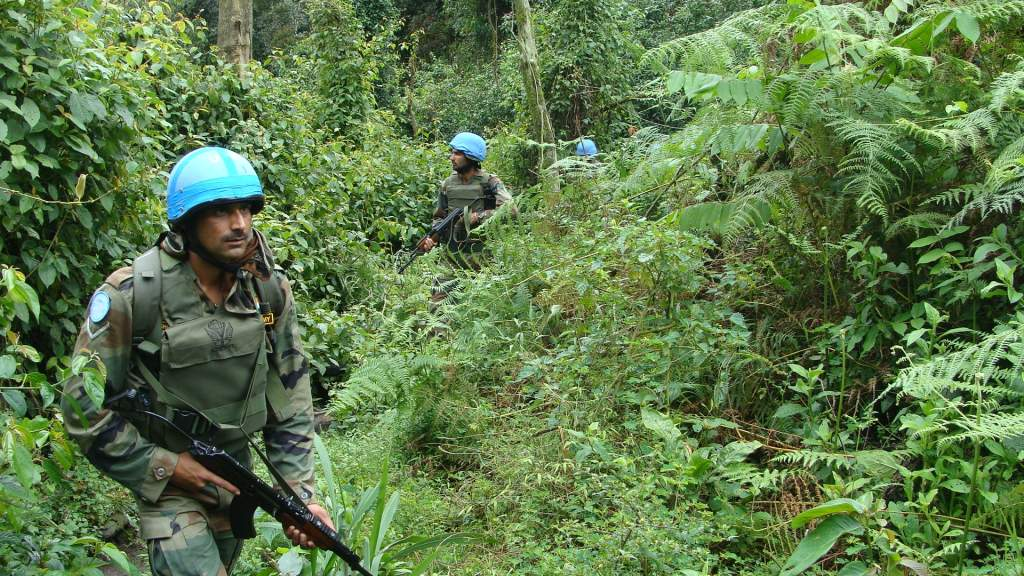
Indian Army patrol under UN mission in Congo, Africa

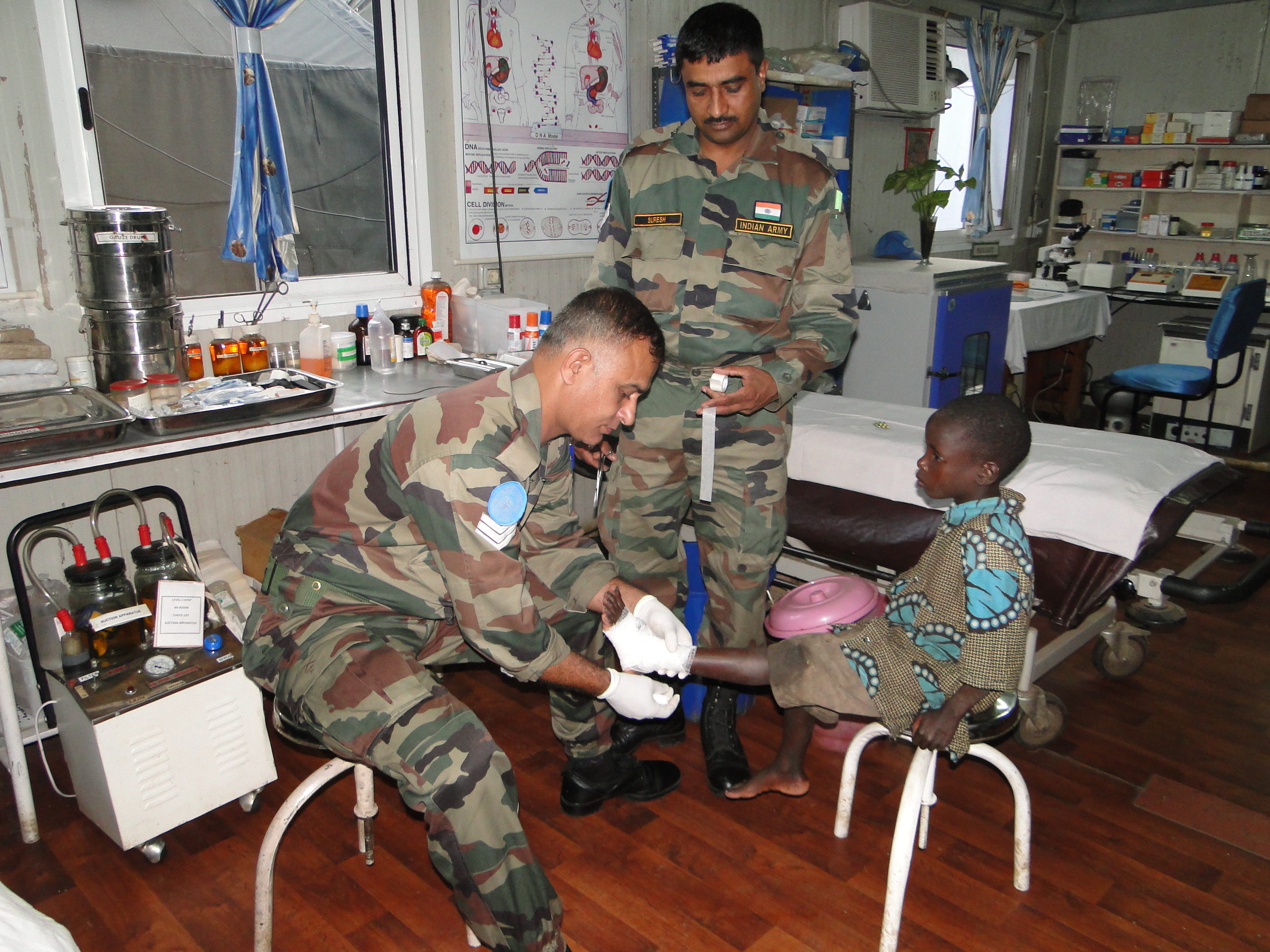
Indian Army doctors attend to a child in Congo

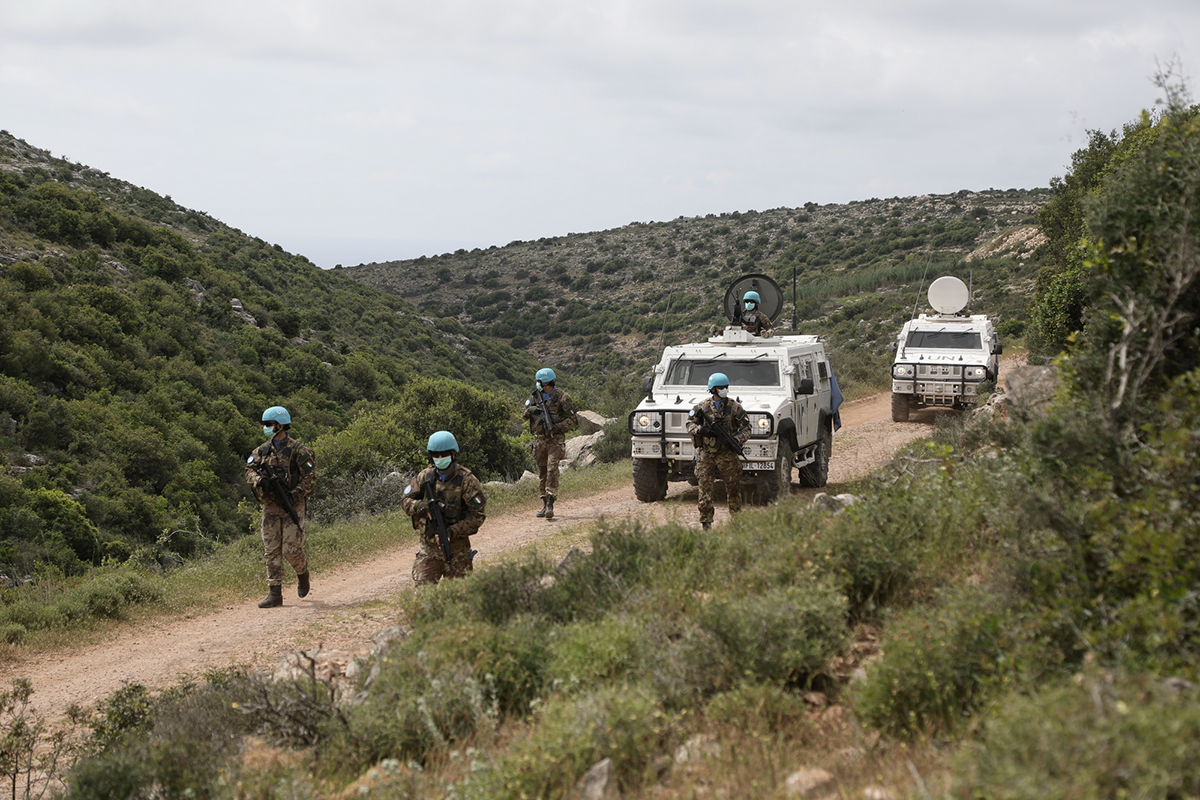
Italian Army Brigade, "Granatieri di Sardegna" patrol in Lebanon under UNIFIL

The end of the Cold War transformed UN peacekeeping. With the Security Council no longer paralyzed by superpower rivalry, larger and more complex missions were established, often to implement comprehensive peace agreements in intrastate conflicts and civil wars. Mandates expanded beyond ceasefire monitoring to include disarmament, demobilization and reintegration of combatants, electoral assistance, human rights monitoring, security sector reform, and in some cases transitional administration of territory. Secretary-General Boutros Boutros-Ghali's 1992 report An Agenda for Peace codified the transition, distinguishing peacekeeping from other activities, and arguing that the boundaries between them were becoming porous. The Department of Peacekeeping Operations (DPKO) was established in 1992 to manage this expanded portfolio.

Several missions of this period are widely regarded as successful, including the UN Transition Assistance Group (UNTAG), which supervised Namibian independence in 1989–1990; the UN Observer Mission in El Salvador (ONUSAL), which supported implementation of the Chapultepec Peace Accords from 1991; and the UN Operation in Mozambique (ONUMOZ), which oversaw the transition from civil war to multiparty elections in 1992–1994. The UN Transitional Authority in Cambodia (UNTAC, 1992–1993), one of the largest operations of the era, organized elections and supervised a partial demobilisation despite the non-cooperation of the Khmer Rouge.

Other deployments failed catastrophically, often where missions had been dispatched without secured ceasefires or the consent of all parties. In Somalia, the UN Operation in Somalia II (UNOSOM II) became drawn into combat with local militias following the collapse of state authority. In Rwanda, the UN Assistance Mission for Rwanda (UNAMIR) lacked the troop strength and political backing to prevent the 1994 Rwandan genocide, in which over 800,000 people were killed. In the Yugoslav Wars, the UN Protection Force (UNPROFOR) was deployed in conditions where "there was no peace to keep"; in July 1995, Bosnian Serb forces committed the Srebrenica massacre in a UN-designated "safe area" despite the presence of a Dutch UNPROFOR battalion. These failures led to a re-examining of the three original peacekeeping principles and their applicability to contemporary crises.

The 1999 reports of Secretary-General Kofi Annan on the Rwandan genocide and the fall of Srebrenica were highly critical of UN actions. This led to the 2000 Report of the Panel on United Nations Peace Operations (Brahimi Report), which called for clearer mandates, more robust rules of engagement, faster deployment timelines, and headquarters reform, and reframed impartiality as adherence to the principles of the Charter rather than equal treatment of all parties.

A separate response was the establishment in 1996 of the small UN Transitional Administration for Eastern Slavonia, Baranja and Western Sirmium (UNTAES), which received a high degree of commitment and became a "proving ground for ideas, methods, and procedures". It was widely considered the most successful UN mission of the decade, and was followed by the more ambitious transitional administrations of the UN Interim Administration Mission in Kosovo (UNMIK) and the UN Transitional Administration in East Timor (UNTAET), both established in 1999.

=== Robust peacekeeping (1999–present) ===
Third-generation peacekeeping has been shaped by the protection of civilians as a central mission task and by the regular authorization of force at the tactical level under Chapter VII. In 1999, Security Council Resolutions 1265 and 1270 saw the first explicit mandate in peacekeeping history to protect civilians in armed conflict, tasking the UN Mission in Sierra Leone (UNAMSIL) to take "the necessary action [...] to afford protection to civilians under imminent threat of physical violence".

Such protection mandates subsequently became a near-universal feature of peacekeeping operations in active conflict zones, even though they blurred the lines between peacekeeping and peace enforcement. The most explicit departure came in 2013, when Security Council Resolution 2098 authorized the UN Stabilization Mission in the DR Congo (MONUSCO) to carry out offensive operations to "neutralize and disarm" armed groups in parts of the country. The Council emphasized the authorization was given "on an exceptional basis, and without creating a precedent or any prejudice to the agreed principles of peacekeeping", but this nonetheless intensified debates about the separation between peacekeeping and peace enforcement.

=== Contemporary peacekeeping ===
In 2019, Secretary-General António Guterres renamed the Department of Peacekeeping Operations into the Department of Peace Operations (DPO), dissolved the Department of Field Support and had its functions absorbed into a new Department of Operational Support (DOS), and consolidated political affairs functions in the Department of Political and Peacebuilding Affairs (DPPA).

Since the late 2010s, a changing political environment and growing tensions with host governments have led to a series of mission closures and drawdowns. MINUSCA and MONUSCO have faced repeated calls from host governments for accelerated drawdown. In 2023, MINUSMA closed at the explicit request of the Malian transitional government, which prompted a broader reassessment of the viability of UN peacekeeping where host-state consent has eroded. As of 2026, no new peacekeeping operation has been authorised since the UN Mission for Justice Support in Haiti in 2017, the longest such span since the 1980s.

== Mission mandates and operations ==
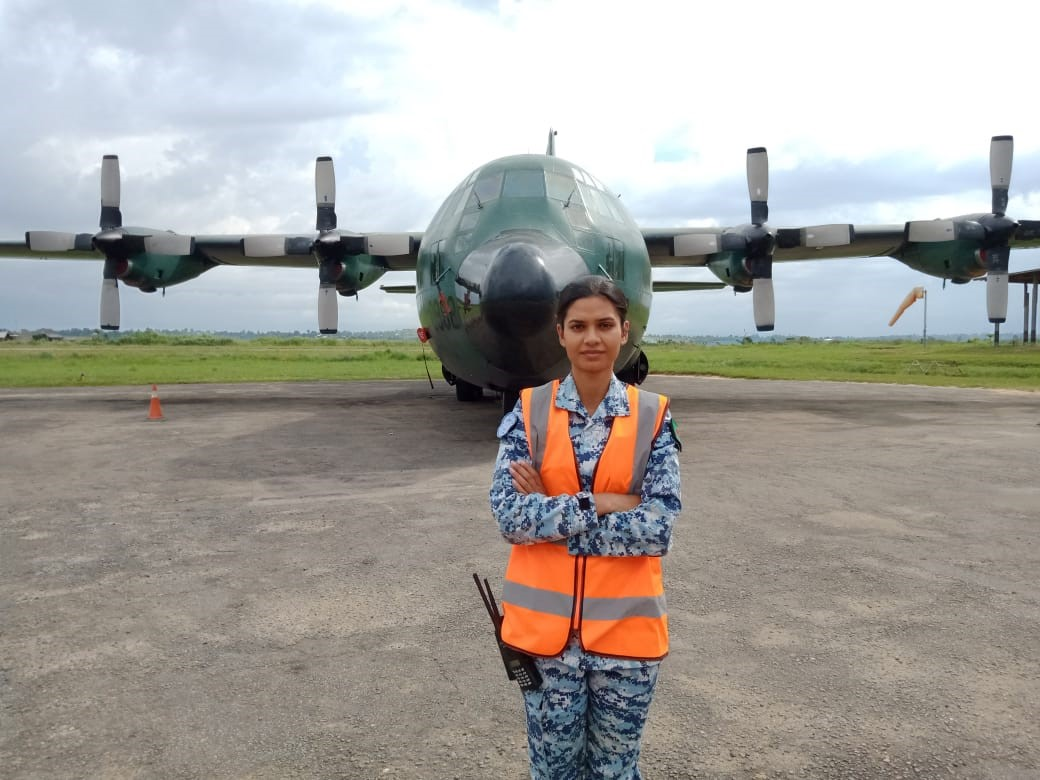
Bangladesh Emergency Crash and Rescue Section of MONUSCO Force, in Bunia, Ituri

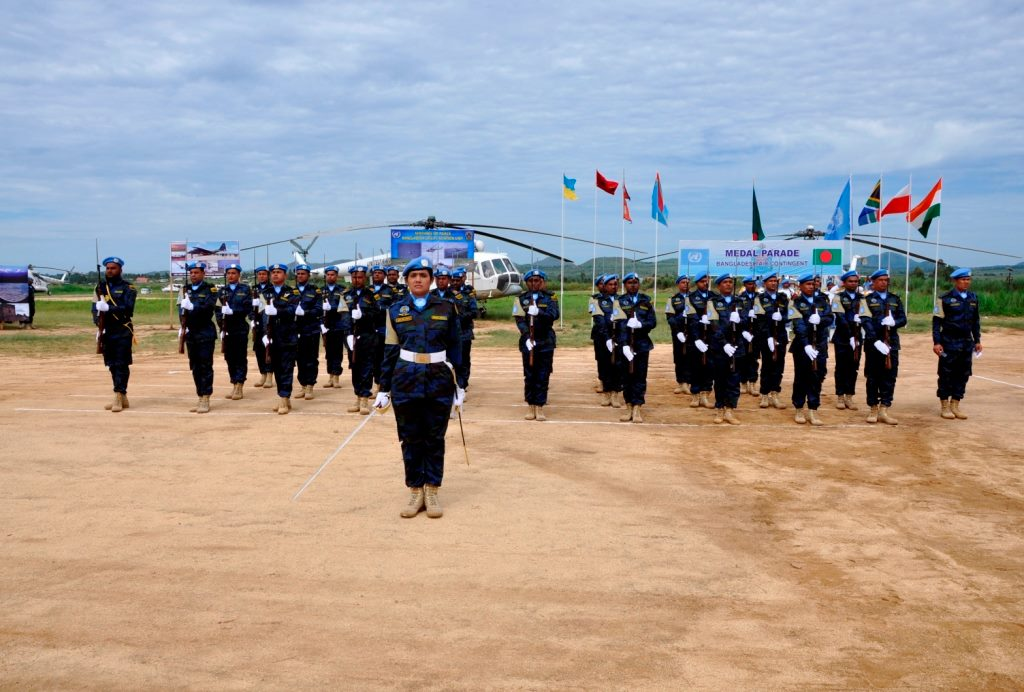
Guard of Honor during UN Medal Awarding Parade at Bunia, Orientale, the Democratic Republic of the Congo by Bangladesh UN Peacekeeping Force

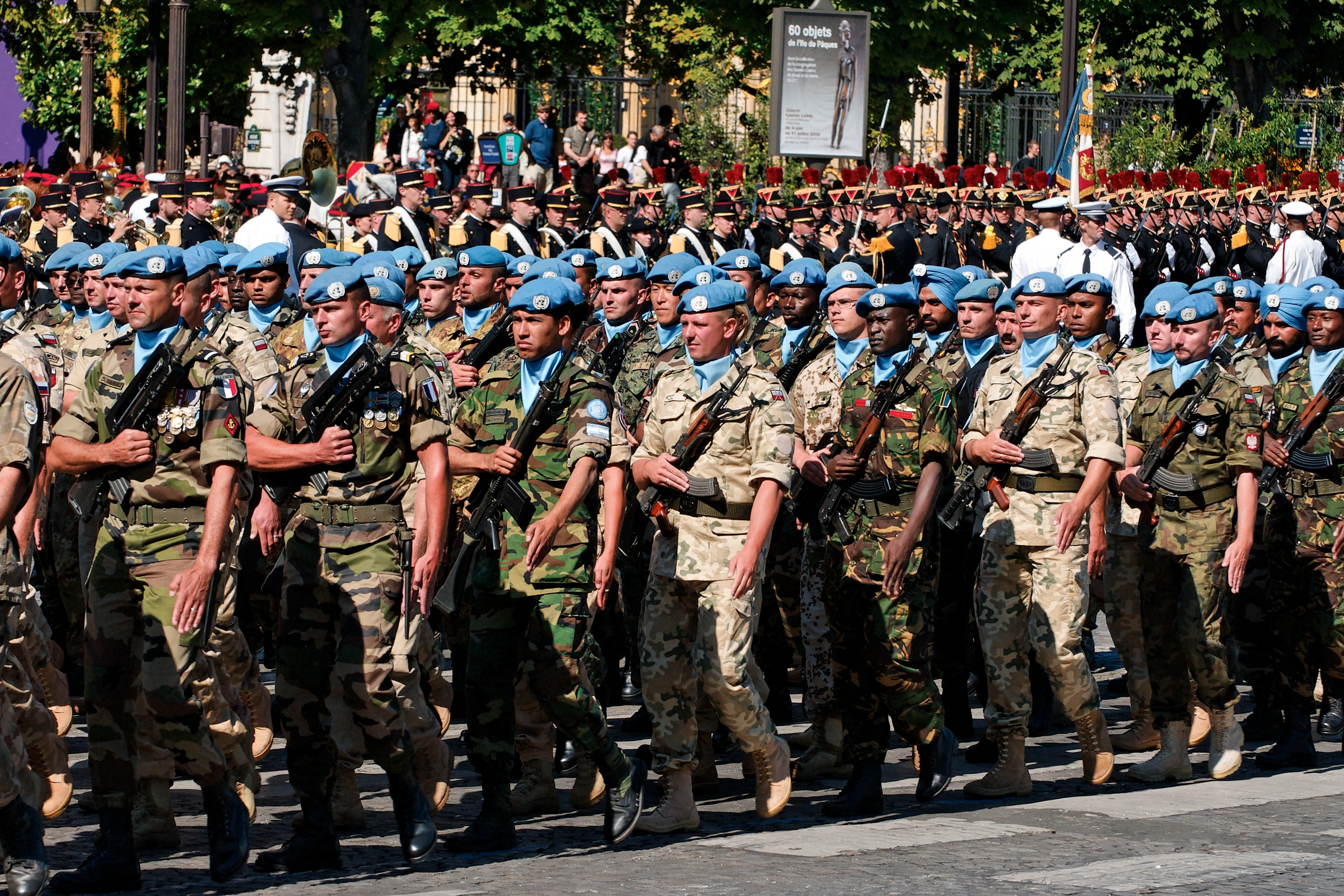
A multinational UN battalion at the 2008 Bastille Day military parade

=== Authorization ===
Every UN peacekeeping operation is established by a Security Council resolution, which sets out the mission's mandate, troop ceiling, area of operation, and rules governing the use of force. Mandates are typically authorized for an initial period of six to twelve months and are subject to renewal by further Council resolutions. Renewals are often politically contested among Council members and with the host state.

When establishing a mission, the Security Council may invoke either Chapter VI or Chapter VII of the Charter, but this is not always specified in the text of the resolution. Chapter VI mandates rely on the consent and cooperation of the parties; Chapter VII mandates authorize the use of "all necessary means" to fulfil specified tasks, most commonly the protection of civilians. Since the early 2000s, the great majority of mandates in active conflicts have included Chapter VII authorizations. A mandate is operationalized through rules of engagement on the use of force, which are developed by the Department of Peace Operations in consultation with troop-contributing countries, and approved by the Secretary-General.

=== Tasks ===
Contemporary peacekeeping mandates typically combine several core tasks, depending on the context of the mission. They may include ceasefire and peace agreement monitoring, verification of withdrawals, supervision of buffer zones, and investigation of alleged violations; disarmament, demobilisation and reintegration of former combatants; security sector reform, including the restructuring of national armed forces and police; electoral assistance, ranging from technical support to directly organizing elections in transitional administration contexts; rule of law and judicial support; human rights monitoring (often in coordination with the Office of the UN High Commissioner for Human Rights); and protection of civilians.

The protection of civilians (POC) has become the most prominent substantive task of contemporary peacekeeping. Since the principle's first explicit mention in 1999, sixteen peacekeeping operations have been mandated to protect civilians; as of 2026, five active missions (MINUSCA, MONUSCO, UNMISS, UNIFIL, and UNISFA) carry such mandates, and over 95 percent of currently deployed UN uniformed peacekeepers operate under a POC mandate. However, implementation has been uneven: independent evaluations, including a 2014 report by the Office of Internal Oversight Services, found that missions under-respond to threats against civilians, particularly where the host state itself is the perpetrator. The expansion of POC mandates has also generated tension with the principles of consent and impartiality, since action to protect civilians from a host state's forces inherently strains the relationship with that state.

=== Mission formation ===
Once the Security Council approves the creation of a mission, the Department of Peace Operations begins planning the necessary elements, including the selection of the senior command team. As the UN maintains no standing force or supplies, the department seeks contributions from member states for each new operation. Forming ad hoc coalitions in this way creates the possibility of failure to assemble a suitable force and produces a general slowdown in procurement once the operation is in the field. Roméo Dallaire, force commander during the Rwandan genocide, described UN peacekeeping as following a "pull" logic, as opposed to the "push" logic of traditional military deployments: "You had to make a request for everything you needed, and then you had to wait while that request was analyzed. [...] In a push system, food and water for the number of soldiers deployed is automatically supplied. In a pull system, you have to ask for those rations, and no common sense seems to ever apply."

Member states deploy their troops at varying speeds. The exact size and composition of the force must be agreed with the government of the host state, and rules of engagement must be approved by the parties involved and by the Security Council. Peacekeepers' freedom of movement within the host country is also subject to negotiation, and host governments have occasionally imposed escort requirements or prior-notification obligations, in some cases in violation of the agreements governing the mission. Such restrictions on freedom of movement have been the most frequently cited obstruction to mandate implementation across contemporary peacekeeping operations. When all agreements have been completed, personnel assembled, and final approval given by the Security Council, peacekeepers are deployed to the operational area.

=== Leadership ===
A peacekeeping mission has several centers of authority. The Head of Mission, typically a Special Representative of the Secretary-General, exercises operational authority over all aspects of the mission and is responsible for political and diplomatic activity, overseeing relations both with the parties to the peace agreement and with UN member states; the Head of Mission reports to the Under-Secretary-General for Peace Operations. The Secretary-General also appoints a Force Commander and a Police Commissioner, alongside any additional senior civilian staff required by the mandate. Force Commanders are typically senior officers of their nation's armed services, often drawn from the country contributing the largest troop contingent. Once assigned under UN operational command, subordinate commanders report only to the Force Commander and should not act on national direction.

=== Financing ===
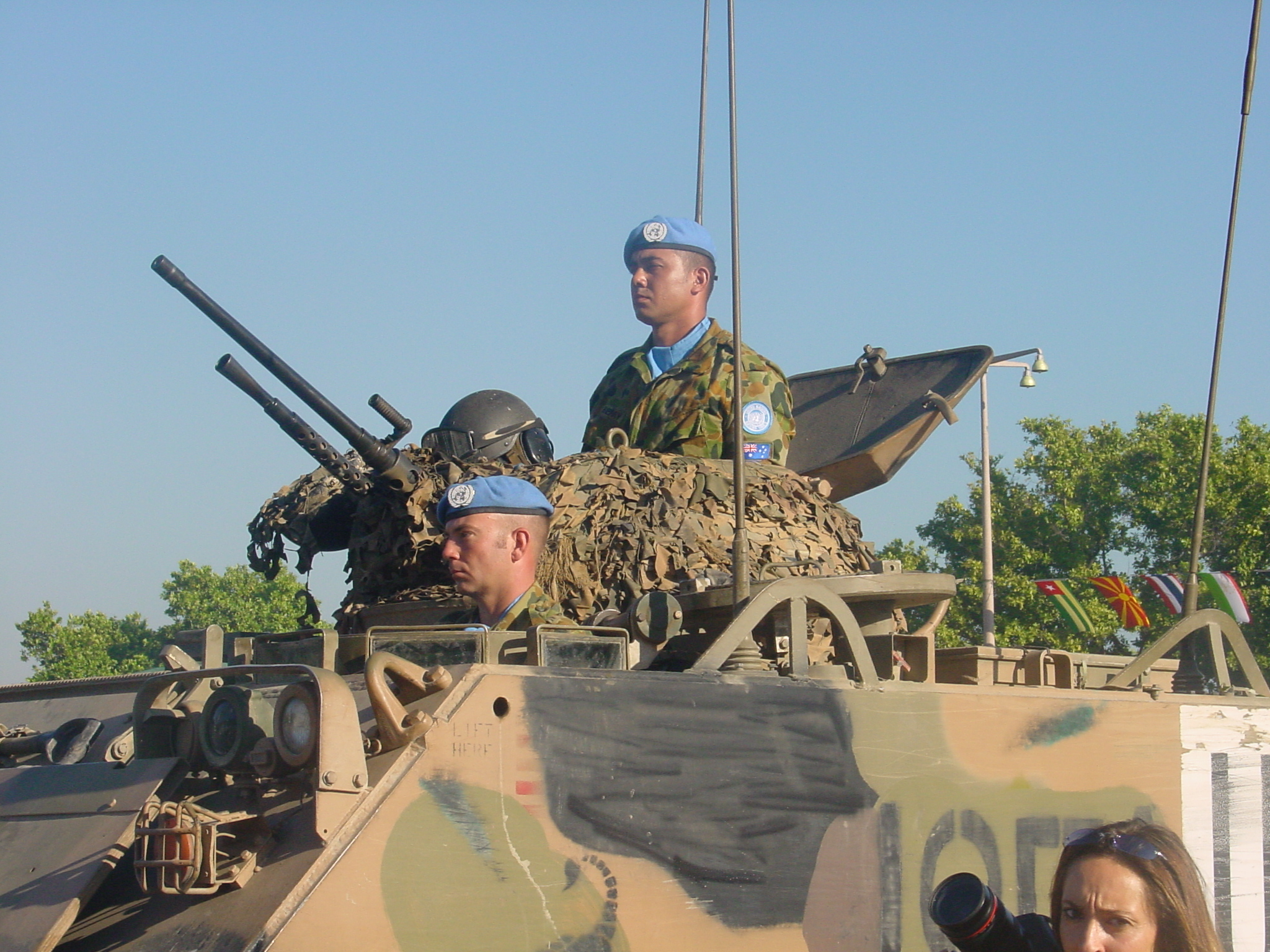
Australian peacekeepers in East Timor

Financing peacekeeping operations is the collective responsibility of UN member states, as outlined in Article 17 of the UN Charter. While the establishment of a mission has to be approved by the Security Council, its budget and resources need to further receive General Assembly approval. In the 2025–2026 fiscal year, the total budget for all active peacekeeping missions was set at $5.66 billion; this excludes the long-running UNTSO and UNMOGIP missions, which are financed through the regular UN budget.

Total UN Peacekeeping budget in $US billions, by year
Fiscal year	Budget (% change from prior year)
2015-2016	8.3(–)
2016-2017	7.9(-5.2%)
2017-2018	7.3(-7.2%)
2018-2019	6.7(-8.2%)
2019-2020	6.5(-3.0%)
2020-2021	6.6(+1.2%)
2021-2022	6.4(-3.0%)
2022-2023	6.5(+1.9%)
2023-2024	6.3(-3.1%)
2024-2025	5.6(-11.1%)
2025-2026	5.7(+1.8%)

Source: United Nations, Reuters

Member states are legally obligated to finance peacekeeping operations according to an apportionement formula which is regularly updated by General Assembly resolutions; these are called "assessed contributions". Assessed contributions are calculated based on a country's gross national income, with poorer states receiving a discount of up to 90% on their potential contributions. Member states can additionally make "voluntary contributions" to peacekeeping missions, including direct financing, transport, supplies, or personnel. The five permanent members of the Security Council collectively provide 59% of all peacekeeping funding, while a group of 31 other wealthy member states contributes a further 36% of the funding.

Largest financial contributors to UN peacekeeping, 2025-26
1. United States (26.9%)
2. China (18.7%)
3. Japan (8.03%)
4. Germany (6.11%)
5. France (5.79%)
6. United Kingdom (5.36%)
7. Italy (3.19%)
8. Canada (2.63%)
9. South Korea (2.57%)
10. Russia (2.29%)

== Personnel ==
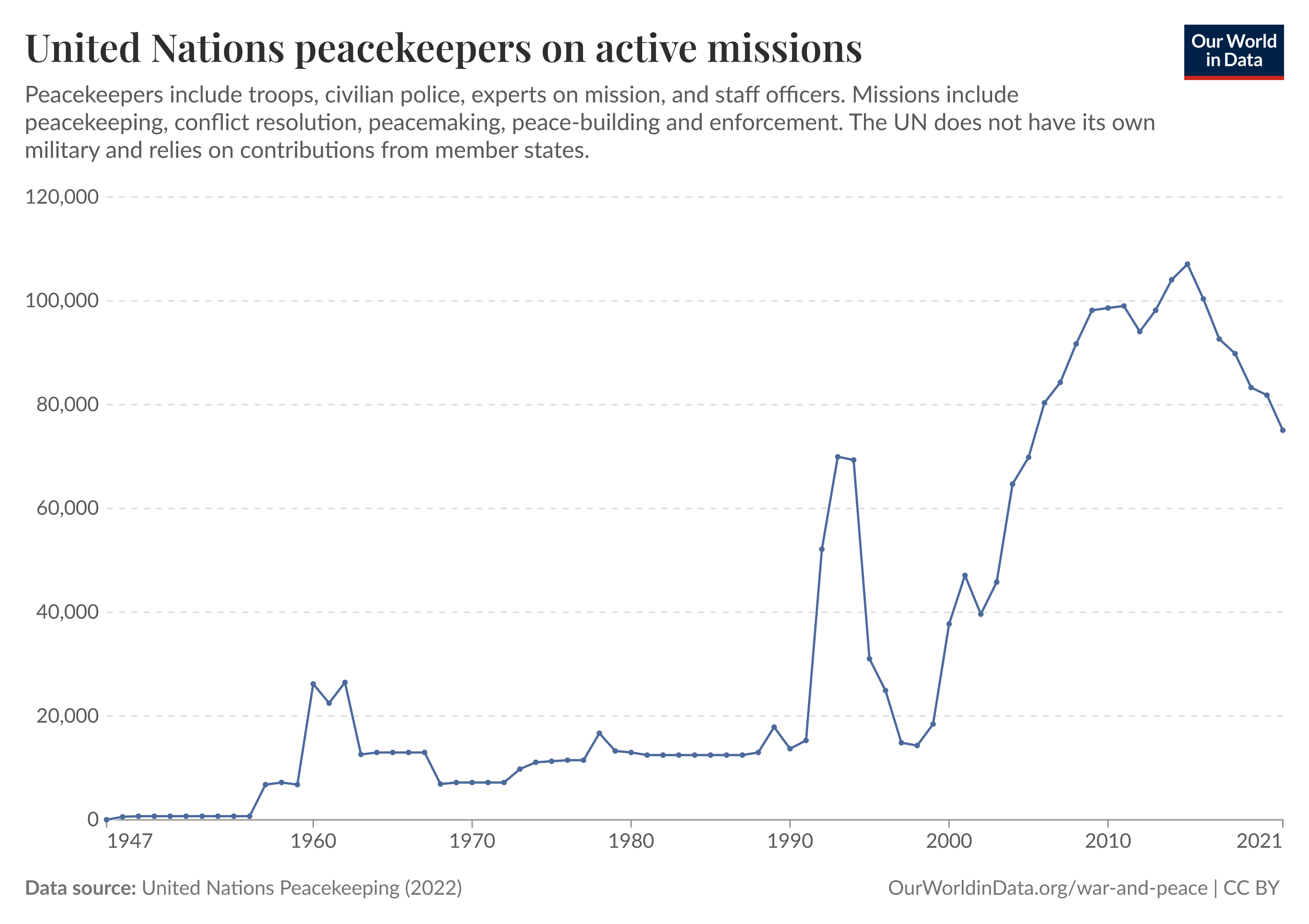
Number of UN peacekeepers on active missions, 1947 to 2021

=== Composition and contributions ===
Peacekeepers are typically trained infantry soldiers who volunteer for the secondment with their national armed forces. The UN does not have its own military force, since all military personnel are, first and foremost, members of their own national armies who are then seconded to work with the UN. While Article 43 of the Charter obliges all member states to make available to the Security Council necessary "armed forces, assistance, and facilities", peacekeeping forces are contributed on a voluntary basis. As of April 2026, there were 53,213 people serving as peacekeepers (46,310 uniformed, 6,752 civilian, and 151 justice and corrections). 117 countries were contributing to peacekeeping operations, with Nepal leading the tally (6,029), followed by Rwanda (5,880), Bangladesh (5,568), India (5,165), and Pakistan (2,662). African nations contribute almost 24,000 personnel, nearly half the total.

Since 1948, more than two million military, police, and civilian personnel from over 125 countries have served as UN peacekeepers across the 72 missions authorized to date. During the 21st century, the UN has deployed more military personnel globally than any actor other than the United States.

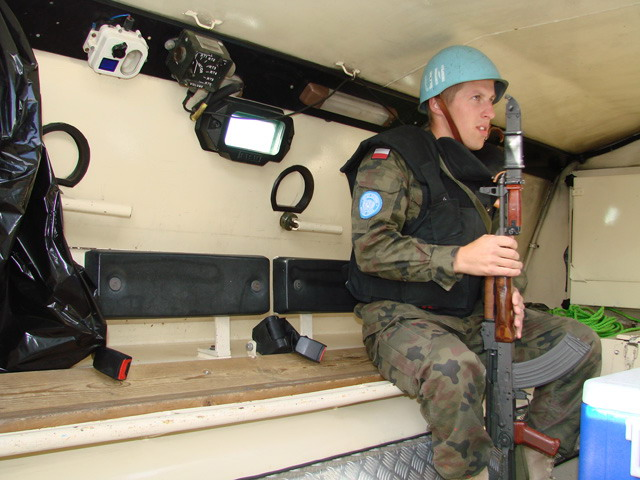
A Polish peacekeeper in Syria

The rate of reimbursement by the UN for troop-contributing countries per peacekeeper per month include: $1,256 for pay and allowances; $123 for personal clothing, gear and equipment; $36 for pre-deployment medical examinations and vaccinations; $10 for inland transportation; and $28 for pre-deployment training.

=== Women ===
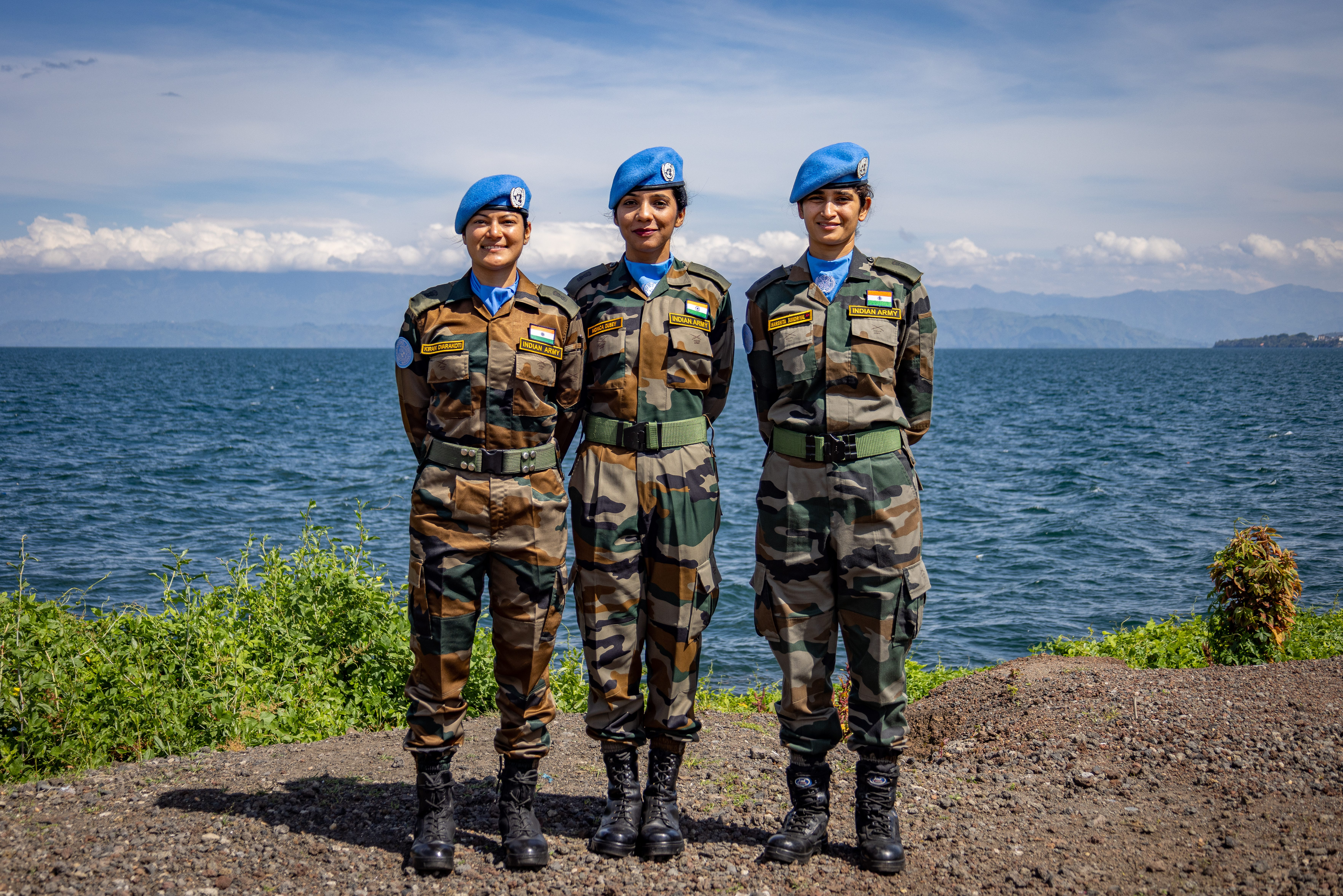
Three female UN Peacekeepers from the Indian Army celebrate International Day of the UN peacekeeper 2023 (on 25 May) in Goma, North Kivu, DRC

Women have participated in global peacekeeping efforts, including operations led by the United Nations. Although participation increased substantially from the 1990s onward, women remained significantly underrepresented in peacekeeping operations as of the early 2020s. Participation rates vary considerably across military contingents, military observers, staff officers and police units.

=== Fatalities ===
Through April 2026, 4,496 people from 134 countries had been killed while serving on peacekeeping missions. The highest death tolls were borne by India (184), Bangladesh (174), Pakistan (172), Nigeria (160), and Ghana (156). Almost 80% of UN peacekeeping fatalities have occurred since 1993.

== Effectiveness ==
There is a large body of scholarship on the effects and effectiveness of peacekeeping operations. The aggregate picture is broadly favourable: peacekeeping is associated with reduced conflict recurrence and fewer civilian deaths, but the literature also shows variation in mission performance and limitations on what peacekeeping can achieve.

The most widely cited finding is that the deployment of UN peacekeepers significantly reduces the risk of renewed warfare after civil war. Fortna's 2008 analysis of post-Cold War peace agreements found that peacekeeping operations substantially extend the duration of peace, and that the effect is robust to controls for the conditions under which missions are typically deployed. Hegre, Hultman, and Nygård (2019) estimate that a substantial expansion of peacekeeping operations would reduce ongoing armed conflict by roughly two-thirds compared to a counterfactual scenario without peacekeeping. Lundgren (2016) further finds that the credible promise of peacekeeping deployment can already encourage combatants to negotiate.

Hultman, Kathman, and Shannon (2013, 2019) found that larger peacekeeping deployments are associated with significantly fewer civilian casualties in African civil wars, with the effect strongest for armed military units rather than unarmed observers. Fjelde, Hultman, and Nilsson (2019) found that peacekeeping was more effective at reducing civilian casualties in active conflict than counterterrorism operations conducted by national governments.

Beyond direct security outcomes, peacekeeping deployment is correlated with improvements in rule of law during periods of peace, with Blair (2020) finding the relationship strongest for civilian rather than uniformed personnel, and where missions engage host states in institutional reform. Bove, Di Salvatore, and Elia (2021) find that peacekeeping deployment in South Sudan had positive effects on local household welfare, meaning mission effects can extend to broader economic conditions in deployed areas.

However, there is considerable variation across missions. Sambanis (2008) found that peacekeeping has stronger short-term than long-term effects. Howard (2019) identifies domestic political conditions, mandate clarity, and mission leadership as critical determinants of success, and argues that effective missions rely less on the threat of force than on factors like persuasion and financial inducement. Pushkina, Siewert, and Wolff (2021) find that mission success depends on cooperation and consent from domestic actors, and missions in situation of contested or eroding consent are significantly less likely to achieve their objectives. The "peacebuilding triangle" framework developed by Doyle and Sambanis (2006) similarly shows that outcomes depend on the interaction of international and local capacities, and the severity of hostility.

In terms of critical perspectives, Autesserre (2016, 2021) argues that missions are systematically constrained by professional cultures that prioritize headquarters knowledge over local understanding, and that effective peacebuilding depends on bottom-up engagement with local conflict dynamics that conventional missions are poorly equipped to provide. The "local turn" in peacebuilding scholarship has questioned whether externally-led missions can produce sustainable peace at all, and has argued that standard effectiveness metrics (such as absence of large-scale violence or signing of peace agreements) capture only a narrow conception of what peace requires.

== Misconduct and harm by peacekeepers ==
Allegations of sexual exploitation and abuse have been documented across numerous UN peacekeeping operations, with particularly substantial records of misconduct emerging from missions in Bosnia and Herzegovina (UNMIBH), Cambodia (UNTAC), the Democratic Republic of the Congo (MONUC and its successor MONUSCO), Haiti (MINUSTAH), Liberia (UNMIL), and the Central African Republic (MINUSCA).

The UN Conduct and Discipline Unit, established in 2005 in the wake of revelations about abuse by peacekeepers in the DR Congo, maintains a public database of allegations against UN personnel. Reported allegations of sexual exploitation and abuse have ranged between approximately 50 and 100 per year across all UN field missions between 2016 and 2026, though the Office of Internal Oversight Services and independent reviews have consistently found that underreporting is substantial. Academic studies have linked the prevalence of abuse to factors including mission size, the presence of large transactional sex economies in conflict-affected areas, weaknesses in pre-deployment training and vetting by troop-contributing countries, and the structural problem that disciplinary jurisdiction over uniformed personnel rests with their home states rather than with the UN itself.

=== Operational harms ===
In addition to individual misconduct, peacekeeping operations have at times caused significant harm to host populations through their activities. The most consequential such case occurred as part of the 2010s Haiti cholera outbreak, when inadequate sanitation at a base hosting Nepalese peacekeepers from the UN Stabilization Mission in Haiti (MINUSTAH) contaminated a major waterway with cholera bacteria carried by infected personnel. The following outbreak killed approximately 10,000 people and infected more than 800,000 over the subsequent decade in a country with no previously recorded cholera transmission. The epidemiological evidence linking the outbreak to MINUSTAH was established by independent investigators within months, but the UN initially declined to accept responsibility and successfully invoked its immunity when sued by the victims. In December 2016, Secretary-General Ban Ki-moon issued a partial public apology acknowledging the UN's role in the outbreak and announced a trust fund for the victims. Similar operational harms, albeit at smaller scales, have been documened in other contexts, including environmental pollution and sanitation failures at mission bases.

== See also ==
- United Nations Department of Political and Peacebuilding Affairs
- International Day of United Nations Peacekeepers
- List of United Nations peacekeeping missions
- List of countries by number of UN peacekeepers
- Multinational Force and Observers
- Timeline of UN peacekeeping missions
- List of non-UN peacekeeping missions
- NATO peacekeeping
- White Helmets Commission
- International security
- Responsibility to protect
- Security-related bills
