= United Nations Mission in South Sudan =

United Nations peacekeeping mission for South Sudan

- Abbreviation: UNMISS
- Formation: 9 July 2011
- Type: Peacekeeping Mission
- Legal status: Active
- Headquarters: Juba, South Sudan
- Head: Anita Kiki Gbeho
- Force commander (acting): Lieutenant General Mohan Subramanian
- Parent organization: United Nations Security Council
- Website: https://unmiss.unmissions.org/

The United Nations Mission in South Sudan (UNMISS) is a United Nations peacekeeping mission for South Sudan, which became independent on 9 July 2011. UNMISS was established on 9 July 2011 by United Nations Security Council Resolution 1996 (2011) adopted on 8 July 2011.

Until his death on 19 March 2026, UNMISS was led by the Secretary-General's Special Representative, the South African lawyer and diplomat Nicholas Haysom, who succeeded David Shearer in 2021.

As of March 2021, it is composed of 14,222 military personnel, 1,446 police, and 2,228 civilian workers, as well as small contingents of experts, staff officers, and volunteers. The military deployment is commanded by the Chinese Lieutenant General Junhui Wu. It is headquartered in the South Sudanese capital of Juba.

== Mandate ==
The stated UNMISS Mandate includes:

- Support for peace consolidation and thereby fostering longer-term statebuilding and economic development
- Support the Government of the Republic of South Sudan in exercising its responsibilities for conflict prevention, mitigation, and resolution and protect civilians
- Support the Government of the Republic of South Sudan in developing its capacity to provide security, to establish rule of law, and to strengthen the security and justice sectors.

The mission was established by Security Council Resolution 1996 and extended to 15 July 2013 by Resolution 2057.

As per Chapter VII of the United Nations Charter, the peacekeeping mission is concerned with the protection of civilians, and thus is not mandated to engage in protection of South Sudan's territory or the sovereignty of that territory (cf. the 2012 South Sudan–Sudan border war).

=== Leadership ===
- Special Representative and Head of UNMISS: vacant as of 19 March 2026
- Deputy Special Representative (Political) and Deputy Head of UNMISS: Guang Cong (China)
- Deputy Special Representative (Humanitarian), Resident Coordinator, and Humanitarian Coordinator: Sara Beysolow Nyanti (Liberia)
- Force Commander of UNMISS: Lieutenant General Mohan Subramanian (India)
- Deputy Force Commander: Major General Main Ullah Chowdhury (Bangladesh)
- Police Commissioner : Christine Fossen (Norway)
- Deputy Police Commissioner : Mutasem Almajali (Jordan)

Force Commanders

| No. | Name | Nationality | From | To | Previous Deployment |
|---|---|---|---|---|---|
| 1 | Maj. Gen. Moses Bisong Obi | Nigeria | 9 July 2011 | 18 November 2012 | Force Commander of the UNMIS |
| 2 | Maj. Gen. Delali Johnson Sakyi | Ghana | 11 December 2012 | 9 June 2014 | Assistant Commandant of the Ghana Armed Forces Command and Staff College, Junior Division. |
| 3 | Lt. Gen. Yohannes Gebremeskel Tesfamariam | Ethiopia | 17 June 2014 | 17 June 2016 | Head of Mission and Force Commander of the UNISFA |
| 4 | Lt. Gen. Johnson Mogoa Kimani Ondieki | Kenya | 18 June 2016 | 1 November 2016 | Deputy Army Chief of Staff-Command and Control of Kenya Army Forces (Dismissed from the post ) |
| 5 | Maj. Gen. Chaoying Yang | China | 3 November 2016 | 6 April 2017 | Deputy Force Commander of UNMISS. |
| 6 | Lt. Gen. Frank Mushyo Kamanzi | Rwanda | 6 April 2017 | 26 May 2019 | Force Commander of UNAMID and Army Chief of Staff of Rwanda Defence Forces |
| 7. | Lt. Gen. Shailesh Tinaikar | India | 27 May 2019 | 5 July 2022 | Commandant of the Infantry School |
| 8. | Lt Gen. Mohan Subramanian | India | 6 July 2022 | 5 March 2026 | Commandant of the Defence Services Staff College |
| 9. | Junhui Wu | China | 5 March 2026 | Incumbent | Defense attaché Embassy of China in Germany |

== Composition ==
UN Security Council resolution 2132 (24 December 2013) authorised a military component of up to 12,500 troops, and a police component of up to 1,323.

India has supplied 2,237 troops; the Deputy Force Commander is India's Brigadier Asit Mistry, while the force commander is Ghana's Major General Delali Johnson Sakyi. Other contributors of troops are Australia, Bangladesh, Belarus, Benin, Bolivia, Brazil, Cambodia, Canada, China, Colombia, Denmark, Dominican Republic, Egypt, El Salvador, Fiji, Germany, Ghana, Guatemala, Guinea, Indonesia, Japan, Jordan, Kenya, Kyrgyzstan, Mali, Mongolia, Namibia, Nepal, Netherlands, New Zealand, Nigeria, Norway, Oman, Papua New Guinea, Paraguay, Peru, Poland, Republic of Korea, Romania, Russian Federation, Rwanda, Senegal, Sri Lanka, Sweden, Switzerland, Timor-Leste, Togo, Uganda, Ukraine, United Kingdom, United Republic of Tanzania, United States, Vietnam, Yemen, Zambia and Zimbabwe.

Police have been contributed by Algeria, Argentina, Bangladesh, Bosnia and Herzegovina, Brazil, Canada, China, El Salvador, Ethiopia, Fiji, Finland, Gabon, Gambia, Germany, Ghana, India, Kenya, Kyrgyzstan, Malaysia, Namibia, Nepal, Netherlands, Nigeria, Norway, Oman, Panama, Philippines, Portugal, Russian Federation, Rwanda, Samoa, Senegal, Sierra Leone, South Africa, Sri Lanka, Sweden, Switzerland, Thailand, Turkey, Uganda, Ukraine, United States, Zambia and Zimbabwe.

== History ==
=== 2012 ===
In a July 2012 speech, a day after the extension of the mission, Hilde F. Johnson spoke in Juba about the progress of UNMISS. Johnson discussed the mission's protection of civilians and the documenting and verification of incidents. Johnson discussed the January 2012 Lou Nuer attacks in Jonglei State whereby the actions of UNMISS in deploying peacekeepers and alerting the South Sudanese government resulted in "thousands of civilian lives [being] saved", as well as progress in areas such as policing, justice and democracy.

On 21 December 2012, a civilian UNMISS helicopter was shot down over Jonglei State. All four Russian crew-members on board the aircraft were killed.

=== 2013 ===
On 9 April, five Indian UNMISS troops and seven civilian UN employees (two UN staff and five contractors) were killed in a rebel ambush in Jonglei while escorting a UN convoy between Pibor and Bor. Nine further UN employees, both military and civilian, were wounded and some remain missing. Four of the civilians killed were Kenyan contractors working to drill water boreholes. One of the dead soldiers was a lieutenant-colonel and one of the wounded was a captain. According to South Sudan's military spokesman, the convoy was attacked by David Yau Yau's rebel forces that they believe are supported by the Sudanese government. UNMISS said that 200 armed men were involved in the attack and that their convoy was escorted by 32 Indian UN peacekeepers. The attackers were equipped with rocket propelled grenades.

A UN spokesman said that the fierce resistance put up by Indian peacekeepers forced the rebels to withdraw and saved the lives of many of the civilians. UN Secretary-General Ban Ki-moon called the killings a war crime, and called for the perpetrators to be brought to justice. United Nations Assistant Secretary-General Anthony Banbury praised the bravery of the Indian soldiers. India's Prime Minister, Manmohan Singh, paid his tribute to the "brave soldiers". About 2,200 Indian Army personnel are deployed in South Sudan as a part of the UNMISS mission.

==== Coup d'état attempt ====
Fighting that spread as a result of the 2013 South Sudanese coup d'état attempt led to the deaths of two Indian peacekeepers, while another soldier was wounded in Akobo, Jonglei, on 19 December. On 24 December, the UNSC voted to nearly double the existing 7,600 troops in the mission, with another approximately 6,000 troops to be added.

The UN Secretary General expressed deep concern as UN staff received threats from the body guards of Senior government Information Minister that demanded armed access to UN Mission Camps where civilians are sheltering. Following this incident President Salva Kiir accused the UN of sheltering armed opposition forces in their UN Mission, which the UN denied. Salva Kiir also accused the UN of an attempted take over of his leadership.

=== 2014 ===
On 17 April 2014, 58 people were killed and at least 100 people wounded when an armed mob stormed the UN base in Bor. A crowd of people who pretended they were visiting the base to present a peaceful petition opened fire on some of the 5,000 civilians who had taken shelter in the UN base. Of those killed, 48 were civilians, while 10 were among the attackers. The violence reflected tension between the ethnic Dinka and Nuer peoples; before the attack, a crowd of local Dinkas had demanded the thousands of Nuer sheltering in the camp be relocated elsewhere.

UN Secretary-General Ban Ki-moon emphasised that any attack on UN peacekeepers constituted "a war crime". The UN Security Council expressed "outrage" at the attack, saying:

The members of the Security Council expressed their outrage at the recent attacks by armed groups in South Sudan that have purposefully targeted civilians as well as UN Mission in South Sudan (UNMISS) sites and personnel, in particular 17 April attack against the UNMISS compound in Bor that resulted in scores of dead and injured, including those seeking the shelter and protection of the United Nations, and 14 April attacks in Bentiu and Unity State.

The members of the Security Council condemned in the strongest terms these acts and underscored that attacks on civilians and UN peacekeepers may constitute a war crime.

In June 2014, Vietnam participated in UNMISS as their first official peacekeeping mission by sending officers from the Vietnam People's Army.

=== 2015 ===
As part of its mandate to conduct human rights reporting, UNMISS released a report in mid-2015 on an alleged campaign of violence by the Sudan People's Liberation Army (SPLA) and associated armed groups in Unity State. The report cited witness accounts of abductions, rapes, and people being killed and burned alive in dwellings.

UNMISS continued to struggle to cope with the large populations of internally displaced people living within the 'Protection of Civilians' (PoC) sites in 2015. The mission was accused in May 2015 of failing to secure the perimeter of the Bentiu PoC site during an expansion of the site led by the International Organisation for Migration.

=== 2016 ===
Ban Ki-moon requested an independent investigation of the deployment be made following reports that on 11 July South Sudanese troops rampaged through the capital, killing and raping civilians and foreign aid workers. The event had occurred following three days of fighting between troops loyal to President Salva Kiir and soldiers aligned with former Vice President Riek Machar that resulted in the deaths of 300 civilians and two UN peacekeepers. Led by Patrick Cammaert, the investigation found that the force suffered from disorganization and a lack of leadership. Ban Ki-moon requested on 1 November that Lieutenant General Johnson Mogoa Kimani Ondieki, the Kenyan force commander, be replaced as soon as possible. The next day the Kenyan Ministry of Foreign Affairs accused the United Nations of using Ondieki as a scapegoat and announced that it would be withdrawing all of its forces from South Sudan.

Head of UNMISS, Ellen Margrethe Løj, completed her assignment in November 2016 and was replaced by David Shearer.

In 2016, the United Kingdom began Operation Trenton, a deployment of over 300 personnel to support UNMISS. It concluded in 2020.

=== 2017 ===
Japanese peacekeepers left South Sudan, ending five years of their mandate under UNMISS. The withdrawals were done in April 2017, followed by two withdrawals in May with Chief Cabinet Suga denying that it was made due to security matters.

The withdrawal came after a deterioration of the security situation in South Sudan following renewed fighting in Juba in July 2016 between forces loyal to President Salva Kiir and former Vice-President Riek Machar. The mission also became politically controversial in Japan after reports surfaced describing the situation as "combat", raising questions about whether the deployment complied with Japan’s peacekeeping laws and constitutional restrictions. Subsequent revelations that the Defense Ministry had initially claimed that key SDF operational logs no longer existed, before later admitting they had been retained internally, leading to accusations that officials had attempted to conceal evidence about the true security conditions faced by Japanese troops.

In December 2017, the mission closed down the first Protection of Civilian site (PoC) in Melut town after IDPs voluntarily requested to return home.

=== 2021 ===
On 15 January 2021, the United Nations Secretary-General António Guterres announced Haysom's appointment as his Special Representative and Head of the United Nations Mission in South Sudan (UNMISS).

=== 2025 ===
On 4 April 2025, the Netherlands decided to withdraw their contribution to UNMISS, effective 31 July 2025. On 4 May 2025, the United Nations Security Council extended UNMISS with one year. Initial talks broke down on 1 May after the United States disagreed on the terms and conditions of the extension. On 4 May a second meeting was held, in which the US approved extending the mission to 1 May 2026.

=== 2026 ===
On 19 March 2026, UNMISS head Nicholas Haysom died in New York.

On 10 April, 2026, Anita Kiki Gbeho of Ghana was appointed as Special Representative.

== Contributing countries ==
As of 31 July 2026, the total number of personnel in the mission is 10,312:

| Country | Police | Experts | Troops and staff officers | Total |
|---|---|---|---|---|
| Albania | 0 | 1 | 0 | 1 |
| Algeria | 0 | 1 | 0 | 1 |
| Angola | 2 | 0 | 0 | 2 |
| Argentina | 6 | 0 | 0 | 6 |
| Australia | 0 | 1 | 11 | 12 |
| Azerbaijan | 0 | 2 | 0 | 2 |
| Bangladesh | 1 | 7 | 1,028 | 1036 |
| Benin | 0 | 2 | 2 | 4 |
| Bhutan | 16 | 1 | 1 | 18 |
| Bolivia | 0 | 2 | 1 | 3 |
| Bosnia and Herzegovina | 9 | 0 | 0 | 9 |
| Brazil | 0 | 2 | 6 | 8 |
| Burkina Faso | 14 | 0 | 0 | 14 |
| Cambodia | 0 | 1 | 54 | 55 |
| Canada | 0 | 0 | 6 | 6 |
| Chad | 0 | 1 | 0 | 1 |
| China | 17 | 0 | 846 | 863 |
| Ecuador | 0 | 0 | 2 | 2 |
| Egypt | 17 | 2 | 2 | 21 |
| Ethiopia | 8 | 4 | 909 | 921 |
| Fiji | 1 | 1 | 1 | 3 |
| Finland | 6 | 0 | 0 | 6 |
| Gambia | 15 | 0 | 3 | 18 |
| Germany | 1 | 8 | 3 | 12 |
| Ghana | 171 | 9 | 418 | 598 |
| Guatemala | 0 | 2 | 0 | 2 |
| Guinea | 0 | 1 | 1 | 2 |
| India | 14 | 13 | 1,772 | 1799 |
| Indonesia | 19 | 3 | 2 | 24 |
| Japan | 0 | 0 | 4 | 4 |
| Jordan | 12 | 0 | 2 | 14 |
| Kenya | 16 | 3 | 6 | 25 |
| Kiribati | 7 | 0 | 0 | 7 |
| Kyrgyzstan | 6 | 2 | 0 | 8 |
| Liberia | 11 | 2 | 0 | 13 |
| Malawi | 2 | 0 | 0 | 2 |
| Malaysia | 15 | 0 | 0 | 15 |
| Moldova | 0 | 3 | 1 | 4 |
| Mongolia | 0 | 2 | 533 | 535 |
| Morocco | 0 | 1 | 1 | 2 |
| Namibia | 0 | 4 | 0 | 4 |
| Nepal | 177 | 10 | 1,052 | 1239 |
| New Zealand | 0 | 0 | 2 | 2 |
| Nigeria | 12 | 2 | 4 | 18 |
| Norway | 10 | 0 | 10 | 20 |
| Pakistan | 13 | 5 | 269 | 287 |
| Paraguay | 0 | 2 | 0 | 2 |
| Peru | 5 | 3 | 1 | 9 |
| Philippines | 19 | 2 | 0 | 21 |
| Poland | 0 | 1 | 0 | 1 |
| Portugal | 4 | 0 | 0 | 4 |
| Romania | 0 | 2 | 0 | 2 |
| Russia | 21 | 2 | 0 | 23 |
| Rwanda | 322 | 11 | 1,429 | 1762 |
| Samoa | 6 | 0 | 0 | 6 |
| Sierra Leone | 13 | 0 | 0 | 13 |
| Solomon Islands | 8 | 0 | 0 | 8 |
| South Africa | 19 | 0 | 0 | 19 |
| South Korea | 0 | 2 | 256 | 258 |
| Sri Lanka | 10 | 1 | 66 | 77 |
| Sweden | 5 | 0 | 0 | 5 |
| Switzerland | 3 | 0 | 1 | 4 |
| Tanzania | 7 | 2 | 3 | 12 |
| Thailand | 16 | 4 | 260 | 280 |
| Timor | 0 | 2 | 0 | 2 |
| Togo | 2 | 0 | 1 | 3 |
| Tunisia | 5 | 0 | 3 | 8 |
| Turkey | 5 | 0 | 0 | 5 |
| Uganda | 17 | 0 | 0 | 17 |
| United Kingdom | 0 | 0 | 3 | 3 |
| United States | 0 | 0 | 7 | 7 |
| Vanuatu | 4 | 0 | 0 | 4 |
| Vietnam | 8 | 4 | 63 | 75 |
| Zambia | 11 | 3 | 2 | 16 |
| Zimbabwe | 18 | 2 | 2 | 22 |
| Total | 1,124 | 139 | 9049 | 10312 |

== Criticism ==
As stated, the UNMISS has been present in the country since its independence in 2011. However, as demonstrated throughout the mission's history, there were numerous incidents that point towards an inability of the peacekeeping forces to protect civilians. In general, scholars such as Weinstein question the effectiveness of peacekeeping missions, and it is not difficult to find a peacekeeping "fiasco" among the numerous peacekeeping missions undertaken within the history of the United Nations. While it is only possible to speculate on counterfactuals for the assessment and evaluation of peacekeeping missions and their effectiveness – i.e. we do not know what the situation in South Sudan would look like if the UN had not deployed peacekeeping forces – an article published in the New York Times has called for an alternative international intervention for South Sudan. Thereby, the alternatives for international interventions are numerous. The article mentions trusteeship as a potential solution to the violent chaos in South Sudan. This form of international intervention was prominently discussed by Fearon and Laitin.

The authors thereby suggest a system of neo-trusteeship, in which peacekeeping efforts should be oriented towards state building under the coordination of a leading (outside) state. This state building should encompass the establishment of institutions that are necessary for increasing South Sudan's capability for collecting taxes, which could increase the governance capacity of the country. To prevent a new civil war in South Sudan, according to Fearon and Laitin's neo-trusteeship approach, a continuous international monitoring and support system might be required. The New York Times article states that some South Sudanese would not tolerate such an international trusteeship and might see it as colonialism.

Furthermore, as pointed out by Weinstein, neo-trusteeship is a post-conflict international intervention. As South Sudan was still in the midst of a bloody conflict as of 2005, Weinstein suggested refraining from any kind of international intervention and leaving the South Sudanese to solve their conflict autonomously ("autonomous recovery"), usually through the victory of one of the conflict parties over the other.
