= Frank Mushyo Kamanzi =

Rwandan diplomat

Lieutenant General Frank Mushyo Kamanzi is the current Rwandan Ambassador to Russia, having been appointed on November 29, 2019. He was previously the Force Commander of the United Nations Mission in South Sudan, being was appointed on 11 April 2017 by United Nations Secretary-General António Guterres. Prior to that, he was the Force Commander of the African Union-United Nations Hybrid Operation in Darfur.

== Career ==
Kamanzi graduated from the National Defense University in Washington, D.C., with a master's degree in national security strategy, and from Makerere University in Kampala with a bachelor's degree in agriculture in the 1980s. He also studied at the Armed Forces Command and Staff College in Jaji, Nigeria and the Army Command College in Nanjing, China, and is a graduate of both schools. From 2012 to 2015, he was the Army Chief of Staff in the Rwanda Defence Force. From 2010 to 2012, he held the position of Commander of the Rwanda Military Academy, and from 2007 to 2010 he was the head of an infantry brigade. From 2006 to 2007, Kamanzi served as the Deputy Force Commander in the African Union Mission in Sudan (AMIS).
