= Nizhnevartovskavia Flight 544 =

2012 aviation shoot down

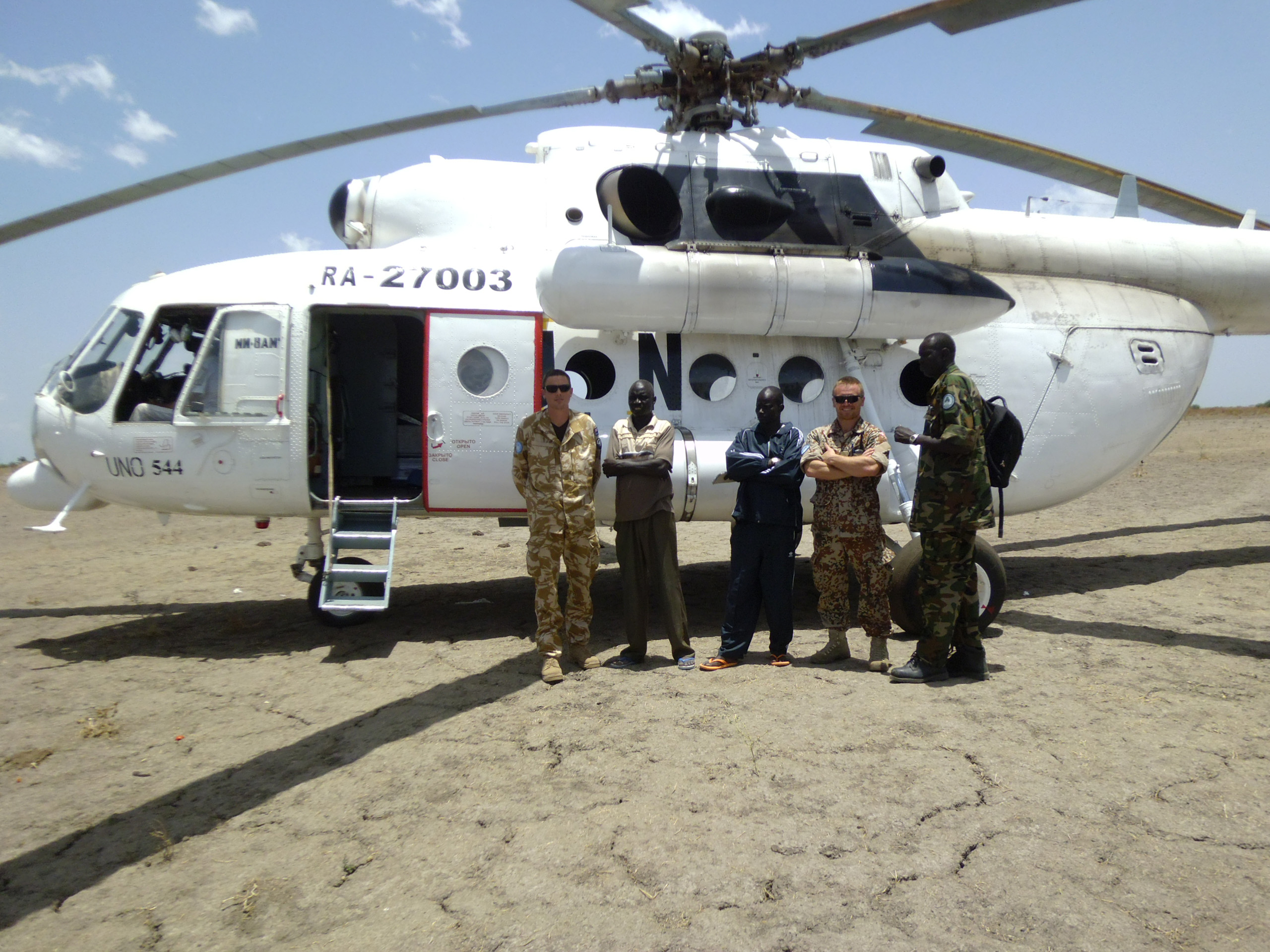
- RA-27003, the Mil Mi-8 involved in the accident

Shootdown
- Date: 21 December 2012
- Summary: Friendly fire incident
- Site: Near Likuangole, South Sudan; 7.049°N 33.0043°E

Aircraft
- Aircraft type: Mil Mi-8
- Operator: Nizhnevartovskavia for United Nations Humanitarian Air Service
- Registration: RA-27003
- Flight origin: Juba, South Sudan
- Stopover: Pibor, South Sudan
- Occupants: 4
- Crew: 4
- Fatalities: 4
- Survivors: 0

Nizhnevartovskavia Flight 544 was a civilian helicopter operated by Nizhnevartovskavia that was shot down by the South Sudanese army (SPLA) near Likuangole, South Sudan on December 21, 2012, killing all four people on board.

Flight 544 was performing a reconnaissance mission for the United Nations Mission in South Sudan (UNMISS) to evaluate overland routes and landing areas for the delivery of humanitarian aid. The flight had originated in Juba. Shortly after taking off from a stopover at Pibor, the helicopter began to take fire from SPLA ground-based anti-aircraft artillery and crashed. The crash site was near the front of ongoing fighting between the SPLA and Murle rebels led by David Yau Yau. The four victims on board were Russian nationals employed by Nizhnevartovskavia.

== Reactions ==
The SPLA initially denied its role in the shooting, blaming rebels instead. The following day, the South Sudanese government admitted its troops had shot down 544. SPLA spokesman Philip Aguer announced that an SPLA artillery unit mistook Flight 544 for a Sudanese government aircraft that had previously been reported in the area, allegedly supplying Yau Yau's militia. He elaborated that before engaging the helicopter, the SPLA soldiers received confirmation from UNMISS that there were no UN flights in the region.

The United Nations Secretary-General Ban Ki-moon immediately issued a statement vehemently condemning the SPLA's attack on "clearly marked" UN personnel and demanding that South Sudan hold accountable those responsible for the shooting and work to prevent future attacks.

Ambassador Vitaly Churkin announced that the Russian government would seek compensation from South Sudan for the families of the Russian crew. He stated that the crew of Flight 544 had cleared their flight plan and obtained a guarantee of security from the SPLA, contradicting the South Sudanese claim about confusion about the identify of the helicopter. He demanded that South Sudan punish those responsible and make changes to improve the protection of Russians working there.

European Union representative Catherine Ashton issued a statement condemning the attack and requesting that the SPLA cooperate with an investigation into the incident.

== Investigation ==
The UN took control of the "black box" flight recorder. The transfer of the recorder to the Russian government was delayed by request of the South Sudanese government, which had set up its own investigation committee, and finally completed on January 21.

== Aftermath ==
Despite the request that the SPLA implement changes to avoid future attacks on UN personnel, another UNMISS helicopter took gunfire on January 5, 2013, while on the ground at Bau, South Sudan. This craft was a Mil Mi-26 transport helicopter operated by the Russian firm UTair. No personnel injuries or damage to critical systems was reported and the mission was completed as planned.
