= Mohan Subramanian =

Senior officer of the Indian Army

Lieutenant General Mohan Subramanian
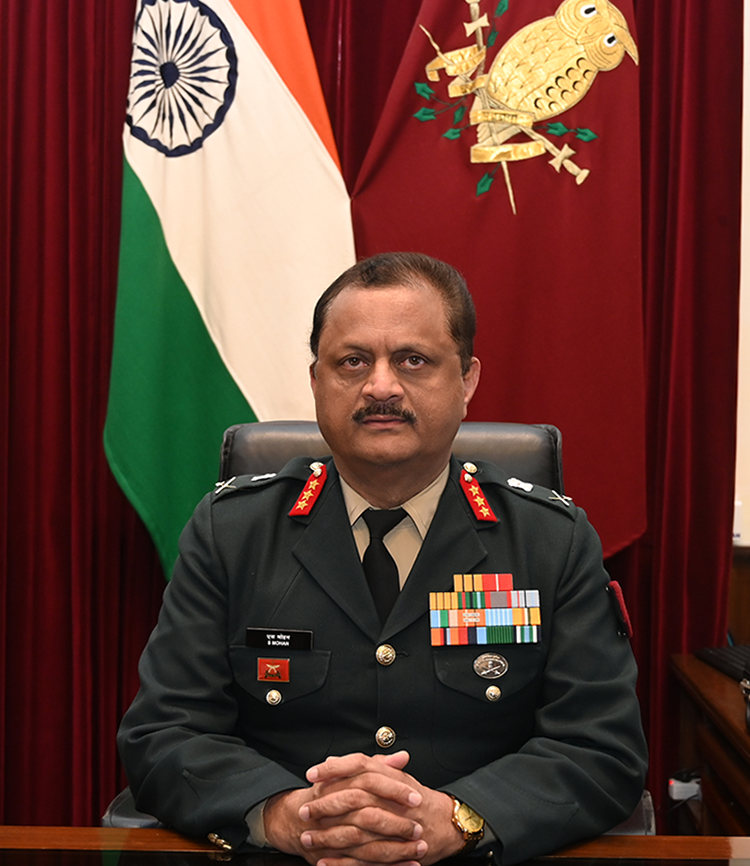
- Lt. Gen. Mohan Subramanian

Force Commander, UNMISS
- Incumbent
- Assumed office 5 July 2022
- Preceded by: Shailesh Tinaikar

Personal details
- Awards: Param Vishisht Seva Medal; Ati Vishisht Seva Medal; Sena Medal; Vishisht Seva Medal

Military service
- Allegiance: India
- Branch/service: Indian Army
- Years of service: 1986–present
- Rank: Lieutenant General
- Unit: Corps of Army Air Defence
- Commands: Commandant Defence Services Staff College; General Officer Commanding Military Region (Operational and Logistic Readiness Zone), Central India; Force Commander, UNMISS

Mohan Subramanian is a senior officer of the Indian Army, with a military career since 1986. He was appointed Force Commander of the United Nations Mission in South Sudan (UNMISS) on 5 July 2022. He previously served as Commandant of the Defence Services Staff College and held operational and staff appointments in India and on United Nations missions.

== Early life and education ==
Subramanian attended Sainik School, Amaravathinagar and later graduated from the National Defence Academy and the Indian Military Academy. He holds two Master of Philosophy degrees in Defence and Management Studies as well as Social Sciences. In addition to Tamil, he is fluent in English and Hindi.

== Military career ==
Subramanian was commissioned into the Corps of Army Air Defence in June 1986. He has commanded an Air Defence regiment in a desert sector, a mountain brigade, and an infantry division in the eastern theatre. He served as Deputy General Officer Commanding of an infantry division, General Officer Commanding of a Strike Infantry Division and Additional Director General for Procurement and Equipment Management at the Integrated Headquarters of the Ministry of Defence.

He served as General Officer Commanding of the Military Region (Operational and Logistic Readiness Zone) in Central India, and later as Commandant of the Defence Services Staff College.

He also served as Defence Attaché to Vietnam, Laos, and Cambodia from 2008–2012, and as a staff officer with the United Nations Mission in Sierra Leone in 2000.

On 5 July 2022, United Nations Secretary-General António Guterres appointed Subramanian as Force Commander of UNMISS, succeeding Lieutenant General Shailesh Tinaikar.

== Honours and decorations ==
Subramanian has been awarded the Param Vishisht Seva Medal, Ati Vishisht Seva Medal, Sena Medal, and Vishisht Seva Medal.
