= United Nations Security Council Resolution 1996 =

UN Security Council Resolution 1996
- South Sudan
- Date: 8 July 2011
- Meeting no.: 6,576
- Code: S/RES/1996 (Document)
- Subject: The situation in South Sudan
- Voting summary: 15 voted for; None voted against; None abstained
- Result: Adopted

Security Council composition
- Permanent members: China; France; Russia; United Kingdom; United States
- Non-permanent members: Bosnia–Herzegovina; Brazil; Colombia; Germany; Gabon; India; Lebanon; Nigeria; Portugal; South Africa

United Nations Security Council Resolution 1996, adopted unanimously on July 8, 2011, after welcoming the independence of South Sudan from Sudan, the Council established the United Nations Mission in the Republic of South Sudan (UNMISS) for an initial period of one year.

== Resolution ==
=== Observations ===
In the preamble of Resolution 1996, the Security Council stressed the importance of a comprehensive approach to peace consolidation which addressed the underlying causes of the conflict and the mutually reinforcing principles of security and development. It deplored the persistence of the conflict and its effect on the civilian population, while stressing the importance of post-conflict peacebuilding, particularly through the strengthening of national institutions.

Meanwhile, Council members called for co-operation between UNMISS and other peacekeeping operations in the area, United Nations agencies and other organisations to implement the post-conflict peacebuilding. The Council also recalled various agreements between the Sudanese government and the Sudan People's Liberation Army/Movement (SPLA/M) concerning the status of Abyei, border security and security in Blue Nile and South Kordofan states.

=== Acts ===
Under Chapter VII of the United Nations Charter, the Council established UNMISS for an initial period of one year with the intention of further renewals if necessary. It decided that the mission would consist of 7,000 military and 900 police personnel. A review on whether to reduce the troop numbers to 6,000 would be considered in three to six months.

UNMISS was tasked with focussing on security and development, including through support for peace consolidation and state-building, supporting the government of South Sudan in conflict resolution, the protection of civilians, establishing the rule of law and strengthening the security and justice sector. It was authorised to use "all necessary means" to enforce the mandate.

The resolution called for unimpeded access and full co-operation with UNMISS from all states. It demanded that the Lord's Resistance Army end attacks against civilians in South Sudan, and for an end to the use of child soldiers. South Sudan was urged to increase the participation of women in society and to reform the prison system.

Finally, the Secretary-General Ban Ki-moon was urged to provide more details on the operation and report on its progress.

== See also ==
- List of United Nations Security Council Resolutions 1901 to 2000 (2009 – 2011)
- Second Sudanese Civil War
- South Kordofan conflict
- Southern Sudanese independence referendum, 2011
- United Nations Interim Security Force for Abyei
- United Nations Security Council Resolution 1990
